This is a list of the bird species recorded in Africa. The area covered by this list is the Africa region defined by the American Birding Association's listing rules. In addition to the continent itself, the area includes Madagascar, Mauritius, Rodrigues, Seychelles, Cape Verde, the Comoro Islands, Zanzibar and the Canary Islands, São Tomé and Príncipe and Annobón in the Gulf of Guinea. It does not include Socotra in the Arabian Sea, Madeira or the Azores.

This list is that of the African Bird Club (ABC) supplemented by Bird Checklists of the World (Avibase) and The Clements Checklist of Birds of the World.

This list's taxonomic treatment (designation and sequence of orders, families, and species) and nomenclature (common and scientific names) are those of the Clements list. Taxonomic changes are on-going. As more research is gathered from studies of distribution, behavior, and DNA, the names, sequence, and number of families and species change every year. Differences in common and scientific names between the Clements taxonomy and that of the ABC are frequent but are seldom noted here.

By the numbers

This list contains 2712 species. Individual endemic species found in a single country are tagged (E-Country); the rest of the endemics are tagged (E) or noted in text. The countries that have endemics and the number in each are listed below.

Places with endemic species:

Algeria (1)
Aldabra (4)
Angola (10)
Ascension (2)
Cameroon (7)
Canary Islands (7)
Cape Verde (5)
Comoros (18)
Democratic Republic of the Congo (11)
Djibouti (1)
Equatorial Guinea (3)
Ethiopia (9)
Gough Island (2)
Inacessible Island (2)
Kenya (11)
Madagascar (109)
Mauritius (28)
Mayotte (4)
Namibia (1)
Nigeria (2)
Nightingale Islands (1)
Réunion (17)
Rodrigues (11)
Saint Helena (17)
São Tomé and Príncipe (25)
Seychelles (14)
Somalia (8)
South Africa (15)
Sudan (2)
Tanzania (29)
Tristan da Cunha (1)
Uganda (1)
Zambia (1)

The sources classify vagrants; they are tagged (V). Some of them occur fairly frequently but are far outside their normal ranges; several have only a single record.

Ostriches
Order: StruthioniformesFamily: Struthionidae

The ostriches are flightless birds native to Africa. They are the largest living species of bird and are distinctive in appearance, with a long neck and legs and the ability to run at high speeds.

 Common ostrich, Struthio camelus
 Somali ostrich, Struthio molybdophanes (E)

Ducks, geese, and waterfowl

Order: AnseriformesFamily: Anatidae

Anatidae includes the ducks and most duck-like waterfowl, such as geese and swans. These birds are adapted to an aquatic existence with webbed feet, flattened bills, and feathers that are excellent at shedding water due to an oily coating.

 White-faced whistling-duck, Dendrocygna viduata
 Fulvous whistling-duck, Dendrocygna bicolor
 White-backed duck, Thalassornis leuconotus
 Bar-headed goose, Anser indicus
 Snow goose, Anser caerulescens (V)
 Graylag goose, Anser anser
 Greater white-fronted goose, Anser albifrons
 Lesser white-fronted goose, Anser erythropus (V)
 Taiga bean-goose, Anser fabalis
 Tundra bean-goose, Anser serrirostris
 Brant, Branta bernicla (V)
 Barnacle goose, Branta leucopsis (V)
 Red-breasted goose, Branta ruficollis (V)
 Blue-winged goose, Cyanochen cyanoptera (E-Ethiopia)
 Mute swan, Cygnus olor
 Tundra swan, Cygnus columbianus (V)
 Whooper swan, Cygnus cygnus (V)
 Knob-billed duck, Sarkidiornis melanotos
 Hartlaub's duck, Pteronetta hartlaubii (E)
 Egyptian goose, Alopochen aegyptiaca
 Mauritius shelduck, Alopochen mauritiana (E-Mauritius) Extinct
 Réunion shelduck, Alopochen kervazoi (E-Reunion) Extinct
 Ruddy shelduck, Tadorna ferruginea
 South African shelduck, Tadorna cana (E)
 Australian shelduck, Tadorna tadornoides
 Common shelduck, Tadorna tadorna
 Spur-winged goose, Plectropterus gambensis (E)
 Muscovy duck, Cairina moschata (I)
 Cotton pygmy-goose, Nettapus coromandelianus (V) 
 African pygmy-goose, Nettapus auritus
 Mandarin duck, Aix galericulata
 Garganey, Spatula querquedula
 Blue-billed teal, Spatula hottentota
 Blue-winged teal, Spatula discors (V)
 Cinnamon teal, Spatula cyanoptera (V)
 Cape shoveler, Spatula smithii (E)
 Northern shoveler, Spatula clypeata
 Gadwall, Mareca strepera
 Eurasian wigeon, Mareca penelope
 American wigeon, Mareca americana (V)
 African black duck, Anas sparsa (E)
 Yellow-billed duck, Anas undulata (E)
 Meller's duck, Anas melleri (E-Madagascar)
 Mallard, Anas platyrhynchos
 American black duck, Anas rubripes (V)
 Cape teal, Anas capensis (E)
 Red-billed duck, Anas erythrorhyncha
 Northern pintail, Anas acuta
 Green-winged teal, Anas crecca
 Mauritius duck, Anas theodori Extinct
 Bernier's teal, Anas bernieri (E-Madagascar)
 Marbled teal, Marmaronetta angustirostris
 Red-crested pochard, Netta rufina
 Southern pochard, Netta erythrophthalma
 Common pochard, Aythya ferina
 Ring-necked duck, Aythya collaris (V)
 Ferruginous duck, Aythya nyroca
 Madagascar pochard, Aythya innotata (E-Madagascar)
 Tufted duck, Aythya fuligula
 Greater scaup, Aythya marila 
 Lesser scaup, Aythya affinis (V)
 Common eider, 	Somateria mollissima (V)
 Velvet scoter, Melanitta fusca 
 White-winged scoter, Melanitta deglandi (V)
 Common scoter, Melanitta nigra
 Long-tailed duck, Clangula hyemalis (V)
 Bufflehead, Bucephala albeola (V)
 Common goldeneye, Bucephala clangula (V)
 Smew, Mergellus albellus (V)
 Common merganser, Mergus merganser (V)
 Red-breasted merganser, Mergus serrator (V)
 Ruddy duck, Oxyura jamaicensis (V)
 White-headed duck, Oxyura leucocephala
 Maccoa duck, Oxyura maccoa (E)

Guineafowl

Order: GalliformesFamily: Numididae

Guineafowl are a group of African, seed-eating, ground-nesting birds that resemble partridges, but with featherless heads and spangled grey plumage.

 Helmeted guineafowl, Numida meleagris
 White-breasted guineafowl, Agelastes meleagrides (E)
 Black guineafowl, Agelastes niger (E)
 Vulturine guineafowl, Acryllium vulturinum (E)
 Plumed guineafowl, Guttera plumifera (E)
 Eastern crested guineafowl, Guttera pucherani (E)
 Western crested guineafowl, Guttera verreauxi (E)
 Southern crested guineafowl, Guttera edouardi (E)

New World quail
Order: GalliformesFamily: Odontophoridae

Despite their family's common name, the two species are native to Africa.

 Stone partridge, Ptilopachus petrosus (E)
 Nahan's partridge, Ptilopachus nahani (E)
 Northern bobwhite, Colinus virginianus (I)
 California quail, Callipepla californica (I)

Pheasants, grouse, and allies

Order: GalliformesFamily: Phasianidae

The Phasianidae are a family of terrestrial birds. In general, they are plump (although they vary in size) and have broad, relatively short wings.

 Udzungwa partridge, Xenoperdix udzungwensis (E-Tanzania)
 Rock ptarmigan, Lagopus muta (A)
 Reeves's pheasant, Syrmaticus reevesii (I)
 Ring-necked pheasant, Phasianus colchicus (I)
 Congo peacock, Afropavo congensis (E-Democratic Republic of the Congo)
 Indian peafowl, Pavo cristatus (I)
 Red junglefowl, Gallus gallus (I)
 Latham's francolin, Peliperdix lathami (E)
 Crested francolin, Ortygornis sephaena (E)
 Gray francolin, Ortygornis pondicerianus (I)
 Chinese francolin, Francolinus pintadeanus (I)
 Coqui francolin, Campocolinus coqui (E)
 White-throated francolin, Campocolinus albogularis (E)
 Schlegel's francolin, Campocolinus schlegelii (E)
 Ring-necked francolin, Scleroptila streptophora (E)
 Red-winged francolin, Scleroptila levaillantii (E)
 Finsch's francolin, Scleroptila finschi (E)
 Moorland francolin, Scleroptila psilolaemus (E)
 Elgon francolin, Scleroptila elgonensis
 Gray-winged francolin, Scleroptila afra (E)
 Orange River francolin, Scleroptila gutturalis (E)
 Shelley's francolin, Scleroptila shelleyi (E)
 Whyte’s francolin, Scleroptila whytei (E)
 Sand partridge, Ammoperdix heyi
 Blue-breasted quail, Synoicus chinensis (I)
 Blue quail, Synoicus adansonii (E)
 Madagascar partridge, Margaroperdix madagarensis (E-Madagascar)
 Common quail, Coturnix coturnix
 Harlequin quail, Coturnix delegorguei
 Barbary partridge, Alectoris barbara
 Arabian partridge, Alectoris melanocephala (I)
 Red-legged partridge, Alectoris rufa (I)
 Chukar, Alectoris chukar (I)
 Rock partridge, Alectoris graeca (I)
 Jungle bush-quail, Perdicula asiatica (I)
 Hartlaub's francolin, Pternistis hartlaubi (E)
 Cameroon francolin, Pternistis camerunensis (E-Cameroon)
 Handsome francolin, Pternistis nobilis (E)
 Chestnut-naped francolin, Pternistis castaneicollis (E)
 Erckel's francolin, Pternistis erckelii
 Djibouti francolin, Pternistis ochropectus (E-Djibouti)
 Swierstra's francolin, Pternistis swierstrai (E-Angola)
 Ahanta francolin, Pternistis ahantensis (E)
 Gray-striped francolin, Pternistis griseostriatus (E-Angola)
 Jackson's francolin, Pternistis jacksoni (E-Kenya)
 Red-billed francolin, Pternistis adspersus (E)
 Cape francolin, Pternistis capensis (E-South Africa)
 Natal francolin, Pternistis natalensis (E)
 Hildebrandt's francolin, Pternistis hildebrandti (E)
 Double-spurred francolin, Pternistis bicalcaratus (E)
 Scaly francolin, Pternistis squamatus (E)
 Heuglin's francolin, Pternistis icterorhynchus (E)
 Clapperton's francolin, Pternistis clappertoni (E)
 Harwood's francolin, Pternistis harwoodi (E-Ethiopia)
 Swainson's francolin, Pternistis swainsonii (E)
 Yellow-necked francolin, Pternistis leucoscepus (E)
 Gray-breasted francolin, Pternistis rufopictus (E-Tanzania)
 Red-necked francolin, Pternistis afer (E)

Flamingos
Order: PhoenicopteriformesFamily: Phoenicopteridae

Flamingos filter-feed on shellfish and algae. Their oddly shaped beaks are specially adapted to separate mud and silt from the food they consume and, uniquely, are used upside-down.

 Greater flamingo, Phoenicopterus roseus
 Lesser flamingo, Phoeniconaias minor

Grebes
Order: PodicipediformesFamily: Podicipedidae

Grebes are small to medium-large freshwater diving birds. They have lobed toes and are excellent swimmers and divers. However, they have their feet placed far back on the body, making them quite ungainly on land.

 Alaotra grebe, Tachybaptus rufolavatus (E-Madagascar) Extinct
 Little grebe, Tachybaptus ruficollis
 Madagascar grebe, Tachybaptus pelzelnii (E-Madagascar)
 Horned grebe, Podiceps auritus (V)
 Red-necked grebe, Podiceps grisegena (V)
 Great crested grebe, Podiceps cristatus
 Eared grebe, Podiceps nigricollis

Pigeons and doves

Order: ColumbiformesFamily: Columbidae

Pigeons and doves are stout-bodied birds with short necks and short slender bills with a fleshy cere.

 Rock pigeon, Columba livia
 Speckled pigeon, Columba guinea (E)
 White-collared pigeon, Columba albitorques (E)
 Stock dove, Columba oenas
 Somali pigeon, Columba oliviae (E-Somalia)
 Common wood-pigeon, Columba palumbus
 Bolle's pigeon, Columba bollii (E)
 Afep pigeon, Columba unicincta (E)
 Laurel pigeon, Columba junoniae (E)
 Rameron pigeon, Columba arquatrix
 Cameroon pigeon, Columba sjostedti (E)
 Maroon pigeon, Columba thomensis (E-São Tomé and Príncipe)
 Delegorgue's pigeon, Columba delegorguei (E)
 Bronze-naped pigeon, Columba iriditorques (E)
 Sao Tome pigeon, Columba malherbii (E)
 Mauritius wood-pigeon, Columba thiriouxi (E-Mauritius) Extinct
 Lemon dove, Columba larvata (E)
 Comoro pigeon, Columba pollenii 
 White-naped pigeon, Columba albinucha (E)
 Pink pigeon, Nesoenas mayeri (E-Mauritius)
 Reunion pigeon, Nesoenas duboisi Extinct
 Mauritius turtle-dove, Nesoenas cicur (E-Mauritius) Extinct
 Rodrigues turtle-dove, Nesoenas rodericanus (E-Rodrigues) Extinct
 European turtle-dove, Streptopelia turtur
 Dusky turtle-dove, Streptopelia lugens
 Adamawa turtle-dove, Streptopelia hypopyrrha (E)
 Oriental turtle-dove, Streptopelia orientalis (A)
 Eurasian collared-dove, Streptopelia decaocto
 African collared-dove, Streptopelia roseogrisea
 White-winged collared-dove, Streptopelia reichenowi (E)
 Mourning collared-dove, Streptopelia decipiens
 Red-eyed dove, Streptopelia semitorquata
 Ring-necked dove, Streptopelia capicola
 Vinaceous dove, Streptopelia vinacea (E)
 Malagasy turtle-dove, Streptopelia  picturata
 Spotted dove, Streptopelia chinensis (I)
 Laughing dove, Streptopelia senegalensis
 Emerald-spotted wood-dove, Turtur chalcospilos (E)
 Black-billed wood-dove, Turtur abyssinicus (E)
 Blue-spotted wood-dove, Turtur afer (E)
 Tambourine dove, Turtur tympanistria
 Blue-headed wood-dove, Turtur brehmeri (E)
 Namaqua dove, Oena capensis
 Zebra dove, Geopelia striata (I)
 Dodo, Raphus cucullatus (E-Mauritius) Extinct
 Rodrigues solitaire, Pezophaps solitaria (E-Rodrigues) Extinct
 Bruce's green-pigeon, Treron waalia
 Comoros green-pigeon, Treron griveaudi (E-Comoros)
 Pemba green-pigeon, Treron pembaensis (E-Tanzania)
 Sao Tome green-pigeon, Treron sanctithomae (E-São Tomé and Príncipe)
 African green-pigeon, Treron calvus (E)
 Mauritius blue-pigeon, Alectroenas nitidissimus (E-Mauritius) Extinct
 Rodrigues blue-pigeon, Alectroenas payandeei (E-Rodrigues) Extinct
 Madagascar blue-pigeon, Alectroenas madagascariensis (E-Madagascar) 
 Comoro blue-pigeon, Alectroenas sganzini 
 Seychelles blue-pigeon, Alectroenas pulcherrimus (E-Seychelles)

Mesites
Order: MesitornithiformesFamily: Mesitornithidae

The mesites (Mesitornithidae) are a family of birds that are part of a clade (Columbimorphae) that include Columbiformes and Pterocliformes. They are smallish flightless or near flightless birds endemic to Madagascar. They are the only family with more than two species in which every species is threatened (all three are listed as vulnerable).

 White-breasted mesite, Mesitornis variegata (E-Madagascar)
 Brown mesite, Mesitornis unicolor (E-Madagascar)
 Subdesert mesite, Monias benschi (E-Madagascar)

Sandgrouse
Order: PterocliformesFamily: Pteroclidae

Sandgrouse have small, pigeon like heads and necks, but sturdy compact bodies. They have long pointed wings and sometimes tails and a fast direct flight. Flocks fly to watering holes at dawn and dusk. Their legs are feathered down to the toes.

 Pin-tailed sandgrouse, Pterocles alchata
 Namaqua sandgrouse, Pterocles namaqua (E)
 Chestnut-bellied sandgrouse, Pterocles exustus
 Spotted sandgrouse, Pterocles senegallus
 Black-bellied sandgrouse, Pterocles orientalis
 Yellow-throated sandgrouse, Pterocles gutturalis (E)
 Crowned sandgrouse, Pterocles coronatus
 Black-faced sandgrouse, Pterocles decoratus (E)
 Madagascar sandgrouse, Pterocles personatus (E-Madagascar)
 Lichtenstein's sandgrouse, Pterocles lichtensteinii
 Double-banded sandgrouse, Pterocles bicinctus (E)
 Four-banded sandgrouse, Pterocles quadricinctus (E)
 Burchell's sandgrouse, Pterocles burchelli (E)

Bustards

Order: OtidiformesFamily: Otididae

Bustards are large terrestrial birds mainly associated with dry open country and steppes in the Old World. They are omnivorous and nest on the ground. They walk steadily on strong legs and big toes, pecking for food as they go. They have long broad wings with "fingered" wingtips and striking patterns in flight. Many have interesting mating displays.

 Great bustard, Otis tarda
 Arabian bustard, Ardeotis arabs
 Kori bustard, Ardeotis kori (E)
 Houbara bustard, Chlamydotis undulata
 Macqueen's bustard, Chlamydotis macqueenii
 Ludwig's bustard, Neotis ludwigii (E)
 Denham's bustard, Neotis denhami (E)
 Heuglin's bustard, Neotis heuglinii (E)
 Nubian bustard, Neotis nuba (E)
 White-bellied bustard, Eupodotis senegalensis (E)
 Blue bustard, Eupodotis caerulescens (E-South Africa)
 Karoo korhaan, Eupodotis vigorsii (E)
 Rüppell's bustard, Eupodotis rueppellii (E)
 Little brown bustard, Eupodotis humilis (E)
 Savile's bustard, Lophotis savilei (E)
 Buff-crested bustard, Lophotis gindiana (E)
 Red-crested bustard, Lophotis ruficrista (E)
 Black bustard, Afrotis afra (E)
 White-quilled bustard, Afrotis afraoides (E)
 Black-bellied bustard, Lissotis melanogaster (E)
 Hartlaub's bustard, Lissotis hartlaubii (E)
 Little bustard, Tetrax tetrax

Turacos
Order: MusophagiformesFamily: Musophagidae

The turacos, plantain eaters and go-away-birds make up the bird family Musophagidae. They are medium-sized arboreal birds. The turacos and plantain eaters are brightly colored, usually in blue, green or purple. The go-away birds are mostly grey and white. The entire family is endemic to Africa.

 Great blue turaco, Corythaeola cristata
 Guinea turaco, Tauraco persa
 Livingstone's turaco, Tauraco livingstonii
 Schalow's turaco, Tauraco schalowi
 Knysna turaco, Tauraco corythaix
 Black-billed turaco, Tauraco schuettii
 White-crested turaco, Tauraco leucolophus
 Fischer's turaco, Tauraco fischeri
 Yellow-billed turaco, Tauraco macrorhynchus
 Bannerman's turaco, Tauraco bannermani (E-Cameroon)
 Red-crested turaco, Tauraco erythrolophus (E-Angola)
 Hartlaub's turaco, Tauraco hartlaubi
 White-cheeked turaco, Tauraco leucotis
 Prince Ruspoli's turaco, Tauraco ruspolii (E-Ethiopia)
 Purple-crested turaco, Tauraco porphyreolophus
 Rwenzori turaco, Ruwenzorornis johnstoni
 Violet turaco, Musophaga violacea
 Ross's turaco, Musophaga rossae
 Bare-faced go-away-bird, Corythaixoides personatus
 Gray go-away-bird, Corythaixoides concolor
 White-bellied go-away-bird, Corythaixoides leucogaster
 Western plantain-eater, Crinifer piscator
 Eastern plantain-eater, Crinifer zonurus

Cuckoos
Order: CuculiformesFamily: Cuculidae

The family Cuculidae includes cuckoos, roadrunners and anis. These birds are of variable size with slender bodies, long tails and strong legs. The Old World cuckoos are brood parasites.

 Crested coua, Coua cristata (E-Madagascar)
 Verreaux's coua, Coua verreauxi (E-Madagascar)
 Blue coua, Coua caerulea (E-Madagascar)
 Red-capped coua, Coua ruficeps (E-Madagascar)
 Red-fronted coua, Coua reynaudii (E-Madagascar)
 Coquerel's coua, Coua coquereli (E-Madagascar)
 Running coua, Coua cursor (E-Madagascar)
 Giant coua, Coua gigas (E-Madagascar)
 Snail-eating coua, Coua delalandei (E-Madagascar) Extinct
 Red-breasted coua, Coua serriana (E-Madagascar)
 Gabon coucal, Centropus anselli (E)
 Black-throated coucal, Centropus leucogaster (E)
 Senegal coucal, Centropus senegalensis (E)
 Blue-headed coucal, Centropus monachus (E)
 Coppery-tailed coucal, Centropus cupreicaudus (E)
 White-browed coucal, Centropus superciliosus
 Malagasy coucal, Centropus toulou
 Black coucal, Centropus grillii (E)
 Blue malkoha, Ceuthmochares aereus (E)
 Green malkoha, Ceuthmochares australis (E)
 Great spotted cuckoo, Clamator glandarius
 Levaillant's cuckoo, Clamator levaillantii (E)
 Pied cuckoo, Clamator jacobinus
 Yellow-billed cuckoo, Coccyzus americanus (V)
 St. Helena cuckoo, Nannococcyx psix (E-Saint Helena) Extinct
 Thick-billed cuckoo, Pachycoccyx audeberti
 Dideric cuckoo, Chrysococcyx caprius
 Klaas's cuckoo, Chrysococcyx klaas
 Yellow-throated cuckoo, Chrysococcyx flavigularis (E)
 African emerald cuckoo, Chrysococcyx cupreus (E)
 Pallid cuckoo, Cacomantis pallidus (V)
 Dusky long-tailed cuckoo, Cercococcyx mechowi (E)
 Olive long-tailed cuckoo, Cercococcyx olivinus (E)
 Barred long-tailed cuckoo, Cercococcyx montanus (E)
 Black cuckoo, Cuculus clamosus (E)
 Red-chested cuckoo, Cuculus solitarius (E)
 Lesser cuckoo, Cuculus poliocephalus
 African cuckoo, Cuculus gularis
 Madagascar cuckoo, Cuculus rochii
 Himalayan cuckoo, Cuculus saturatus (V)
 Common cuckoo, Cuculus canorus

Nightjars and allies 
Order: CaprimulgiformesFamily: Caprimulgidae

Nightjars are medium-sized nocturnal birds that usually nest on the ground. They have long wings, short legs and very short bills. Most have small feet, of little use for walking, and long pointed wings. Their soft plumage is camouflaged to resemble bark or leaves.

 Collared nightjar, Gactornis enarratus (E-Madagascar)
 Pennant-winged nightjar, Caprimulgus vexillarius (E)
 Standard-winged nightjar, Caprimulgus longipennis (E)
 Brown nightjar, Caprimulgus binotatus (E)
 Red-necked nightjar, Caprimulgus ruficollis
 Eurasian nightjar, Caprimulgus europaeus
 Sombre nightjar, Caprimulgus fraenatus (E)
 Rufous-cheeked nightjar, Caprimulgus rufigena (E)
 Egyptian nightjar, Caprimulgus aegyptius
 Nubian nightjar, Caprimulgus nubicus
 Golden nightjar, Caprimulgus eximius (E)
 Donaldson-Smith's nightjar, Caprimulgus donaldsoni (E)
 Fiery-necked nightjar, Caprimulgus pectoralis (E)
 Montane nightjar, Caprimulgus poliocephalus (E)
 Madagascar nightjar, Caprimulgus madagascariensis
 Swamp nightjar, Caprimulgus natalensis (E)
 Plain nightjar, Caprimulgus inornatus
 Star-spotted nightjar, Caprimulgus stellatus (E)
 Nechisar nightjar, Caprimulgus solala (E-Ethiopia)
 Freckled nightjar, Caprimulgus tristigma (E)
 Itombwe nightjar, Caprimulgus prigoginei (E)
 Bates's nightjar, Caprimulgus batesi (E)
 Long-tailed nightjar, Caprimulgus climacurus (E)
 Slender-tailed nightjar, Caprimulgus clarus (E)
 Square-tailed nightjar, Caprimulgus fossii (E)

Swifts
Order: CaprimulgiformesFamily: Apodidae

Swifts are small birds which spend the majority of their lives flying. These birds have very short legs and never settle voluntarily on the ground, perching instead only on vertical surfaces. Many swifts have long swept-back wings which resemble a crescent or boomerang.

 Madagascar spinetail, Zoonavena grandidieri (E-Madagascar)
 Sao Tome spinetail, Zoonavena thomensis (E-São Tomé and Príncipe)
 Mottled spinetail, Telacanthura ussheri (E)
 Black spinetail, Telacanthura melanopygia (E)
 Sabine's spinetail, Rhaphidura sabini (E)
 Cassin's spinetail, Neafrapus cassini (E)
 Bat-like spinetail, Neafrapus boehmi (E)
 Chimney swift, Chaetura pelagica (V)
 White-throated needletail, Hirundapus caudacutus (V)
 Seychelles swiftlet, Aerodramus elaphrus (E-Seychelles)
 Mascarene swiftlet, Aerodramus francicus 
 Scarce swift, Schoutedenapus myoptilus (E)
 Alpine swift, Apus melba
 Mottled swift, Apus aequatorialis (E)
 Alexander's swift, Apus alexandri (E-Cape Verde)
 Common swift, Apus apus
 Plain swift, Apus unicolor
 Nyanza swift, Apus niansae (E)
 Pallid swift, Apus pallidus
 African swift, Apus barbatus (E)
 Forbes-Watson's swift, Apus berliozi (E)
 Bradfield's swift, Apus bradfieldi (E)
 Malagasy swift, Apus balstoni
 Pacific swift, Apus pacificus (V)
 Little swift, Apus affinis
 Horus swift, Apus horus (E)
 White-rumped swift, Apus caffer
 Bates's swift, Apus batesi (E)
 African palm-swift, Cypsiurus parvus
 Malagasy palm-swift, Cypsiurus gracilis

Flufftails
Order: GruiformesFamily: Sarothruridae

The flufftails are a small family of ground-dwelling birds found only in Madagascar and sub-Saharan Africa.

 Madagascar wood-rail, Mentocrex kioloides (E-Madagascar)
 Tsingy wood-rail, Mentocrex beankaensis (E-Madagascar)
 White-spotted flufftail, Sarothrura pulchra
 Buff-spotted flufftail, Sarothrura elegans
 Red-chested flufftail, Sarothrura rufa
 Chestnut-headed flufftail, Sarothrura lugens
 Streaky-breasted flufftail, Sarothrura boehmi
 Striped flufftail, Sarothrura affinis
 Madagascar flufftail, Sarothrura insularis (E-Madagascar)
 White-winged flufftail, Sarothrura ayresi
 Slender-billed flufftail, Sarothrura watersi (E-Madagascar)

Rails, gallinules, and coots
Order: GruiformesFamily: Rallidae

Rallidae is a large family of small to medium-sized birds which includes the rails, crakes, coots and gallinules. Typically they inhabit dense vegetation in damp environments near lakes, swamps or rivers. In general they are shy and secretive birds, making them difficult to observe. Most species have strong legs and long toes which are well adapted to soft uneven surfaces. They tend to have short, rounded wings and to be weak fliers.

 Water rail, Rallus aquaticus
 African rail, Rallus caerulescens (E)
 Madagascar rail, Rallus madagascariensis (E-Madagascar)
 White-throated rail, Dryolimnas cuvieri
 Reunion rail, Dryolimnas augusti (E-Réunion) Extinct
 Red rail, Aphanapteryx bonasia (E-Mauritius) Extinct
 Rodrigues rail, Erythromachus leguati (E-Rodrigues) Extinct
 Corn crake, Crex crex
 African crake, Crex egregia (E)
 Rouget's rail, Rougetius rougetii (E)
 St. Helena crake, Atlantisia podarces (E-St. Helena) Extinct
 Ascension crake, Mundia elpenor (E-Ascension) Extinct
 Inaccessible Island rail, Atlantasia rogersi (E-Inaccessible Island)
 Buff-banded rail, Gallirallus philippensis (V)
 Gray-throated rail, Canirallus oculeus
 Sora, Porzana carolina (V)
 Spotted crake, Porzana porzana
 Eurasian moorhen, Gallinula chloropus
 Gough moorhen, Gallinula comeri (E-Gough Island)
 Tristan moorhen, Gallinula nesiotis (E-Tristan da Cunha) Extinct
 Eurasian coot, Fulica atra
 Mascarene coot, Fulica newtonii Extinct
 Red-knobbed coot, Fulica cristata
 Allen's gallinule, Porphyrio alleni
 Purple gallinule, Porphyrio martinica (V)
 Reunion gallinule, Porphyrio caerulescens (E-Réunion) Extinct
 Western swamphen, Porphyrio porphyrio
 African swamphen, Porphyrio madagascariensis
 Nkulengu rail, Himantornis haematopus (E)
 Watercock, Gallicrex cinerea (V)
 White-breasted waterhen, Amaurornis phoenicurus (V)
 Striped crake, Amaurornis marginalis (E)
 Black crake, Zapornia flavirostra
 Little crake, Zapornia parva
 Baillon's crake, Zapornia pusilla
 St. Helena rail, Zapornia astrictocarpus (E-St. Helena) Extinct
 Sakalava rail, Zapornia olivieri (E-Madagascar)

Finfoots
Order: GruiformesFamily: Heliornithidae

Heliornithidae is a small family of tropical birds with webbed lobes on their feet similar to those of grebes and coots.

 African finfoot, Podica senegalensis (E)

Cranes

Order: GruiformesFamily: Gruidae

Cranes are large, long-legged and long-necked birds. Unlike the similar-looking but unrelated herons, cranes fly with necks outstretched, not pulled back. Most have elaborate and noisy courting displays or "dances".

 Gray crowned-crane, Balearica regulorum (E)
 Black crowned-crane, Balearica pavonina (E)
 Demoiselle crane, Anthropoides virgo
 Blue crane, Anthropoides paradiseus (E)
 Wattled crane, Bugeranus carunculatus (E)
 Common crane, Grus grus

Sheathbills
Order: CharadriiformesFamily: Chionididae

The sheathbills are scavengers of the Antarctic regions. They have white plumage and look plump and dove-like but are believed to be similar to the ancestors of the modern gulls and terns.

 Snowy sheathbill, Chionis albus (V) (ship-assisted)

Thick-knees
Order: CharadriiformesFamily: Burhinidae

The thick-knees are a group of waders found worldwide within the tropical zone, with some species also breeding in temperate Europe and Australia. They are medium to large waders with strong black or yellow-black bills, large yellow eyes, and cryptic plumage. Despite being classed as waders, most species have a preference for arid or semi-arid habitats.

 Water thick-knee, Burhinus vermiculatus (E)
 Eurasian thick-knee, Burhinus oedicnemus
 Indian thick-knee, Burhinus indicus (V)
 Senegal thick-knee, Burhinus senegalensis
 Spotted thick-knee, Burhinus capensis

Egyptian plover
Order: CharadriiformesFamily: Pluvianidae

The Egyptian plover is found across equatorial Africa and along the Nile River.

 Egyptian plover, Pluvianus aegyptius

Stilts and avocets
Order: CharadriiformesFamily: Recurvirostridae

Recurvirostridae is a family of large wading birds, which includes the avocets and stilts. The avocets have long legs and long up-curved bills. The stilts have extremely long legs and long, thin, straight bills.

 Black-winged stilt, Himantopus himantopus
 Pied avocet, Recurvirostra avosetta

Ibisbill
Order: CharadriiformesFamily: Ibidorhynchidae

The ibisbill is related to the waders, but is sufficiently distinctive to be a family unto itself. The adult is gray with a white belly, red legs, a long down curved bill, and a black face and breast band.

Ibisbill, Ibidorhyncha struthersii (V)

Oystercatchers
Order: CharadriiformesFamily: Haematopodidae

The oystercatchers are large and noisy plover-like birds, with strong bills used for smashing or prising open molluscs.

 Eurasian oystercatcher, Haematopus ostralegus
 African oystercatcher, Haematopus moquini (E)

Plovers and lapwings

Order: CharadriiformesFamily: Charadriidae

The family Charadriidae includes the plovers, dotterels and lapwings. They are small to medium-sized birds with compact bodies, short, thick necks and long, usually pointed, wings. They are found in open country worldwide, mostly in habitats near water.

 Black-bellied plover, Pluvialis squatarola
 European golden-plover, Pluvialis apricaria
 American golden-plover, Pluvialis dominica (V)
 Pacific golden-plover, Pluvialis fulva (V)
 Northern lapwing, Vanellus vanellus
 Long-toed lapwing, Vanellus crassirostris (E)
 Blacksmith lapwing, Vanellus armatus (E)
 Spur-winged lapwing, Vanellus spinosus
 Black-headed lapwing, Vanellus tectus
 White-headed lapwing, Vanellus albiceps (E)
 Senegal lapwing, Vanellus lugubris
 Black-winged lapwing, Vanellus melanopterus (E)
 Crowned lapwing, Vanellus coronatus (E)
 Wattled lapwing, Vanellus senegallus (E)
 Spot-breasted lapwing, Vanellus melanocephalus (E-Ethiopia)
 Brown-chested lapwing, Vanellus superciliosus (E)
 Sociable lapwing, Vanellus gregarius
 White-tailed lapwing, Vanellus leucurus
 Lesser sand-plover, Charadrius mongolus
 Greater sand-plover, Charadrius leschenaultii
 Caspian plover, Charadrius asiaticus
 Kittlitz's plover, Charadrius pecuarius
 Kentish plover, Charadrius alexandrinus
 Common ringed plover, Charadrius hiaticula
 Semipalmated plover, Charadrius semipalmatus (V)
 Madagascar plover, Charadrius thoracicus (E-Madagascar)
 Little ringed plover, Charadrius dubius
 Three-banded plover, Charadrius tricollaris
 Forbes's plover, Charadrius forbesi (E)
 White-fronted plover, Charadrius marginatus
 Chestnut-banded plover, Charadrius pallidus (E)
 Oriental plover, Charadrius veredus (V)
 Eurasian dotterel, Charadrius morinellus
 St. Helena plover, Charadrius sanctaehelenae (E-St. Helena)

Painted-snipes
Order: CharadriiformesFamily: Rostratulidae

Painted-snipes are short-legged, long-billed birds similar in shape to the true snipes, but more brightly colored.

 Greater painted-snipe, Rostratula benghalensis

Jacanas
Order: CharadriiformesFamily: Jacanidae

The jacanas are a family of waders found throughout the tropics. They are identifiable by their huge feet and claws which enable them to walk on floating vegetation in the shallow lakes that are their preferred habitat.

 Lesser jacana, Microparra capensis (E)
 African jacana, Actophilornis africanus (E)
 Madagascar jacana, Actophilornis albinucha (E-Madagascar)

Sandpipers and allies
Order: CharadriiformesFamily: Scolopacidae

Scolopacidae is a large diverse family of small to medium-sized shorebirds including the sandpipers, curlews, godwits, shanks, tattlers, woodcocks, snipes, dowitchers and phalaropes. The majority of these species eat small invertebrates picked out of the mud or soil. Variation in length of legs and bills enables multiple species to feed in the same habitat, particularly on the coast, without direct competition for food.

 Upland sandpiper, Bartramia longicauda (V)
 Whimbrel, Numenius phaeopus
 Little curlew, Numenius minutus
 Far Eastern curlew, Numenius madagascariensis
 Slender-billed curlew, Numenius tenuirostris
 Eurasian curlew, Numenius arquata
 Bar-tailed godwit, Limosa lapponica
 Black-tailed godwit, Limosa limosa
 Hudsonian godwit, Limosa haemastica (V)
 Ruddy turnstone, Arenaria interpres
 Great knot, Calidris tenuirostris (V)
 Red knot, Calidris canutus
 Ruff, Calidris pugnax
 Broad-billed sandpiper, Calidris falcinellus
 Sharp-tailed sandpiper, Calidris acuminata (V)
 Stilt sandpiper, Calidris himantopus (V)
 Curlew sandpiper, Calidris ferruginea
 Temminck's stint, Calidris temminckii
 Long-toed stint, Calidris subminuta (V)
 Red-necked stint, Calidris ruficollis (V)
 Sanderling, Calidris alba
 Dunlin, Calidris alpina
 Purple sandpiper, Calidris maritima (V)
 Baird's sandpiper, Calidris bairdii (V)
 Little stint, Calidris minuta (V)
 Least sandpiper, Calidris minutilla (V)
 White-rumped sandpiper, Calidris fuscicollis (V)
 Buff-breasted sandpiper, Calidris subruficollis (V)
 Pectoral sandpiper, Calidris melanotos (V)
 Semipalmated sandpiper, Calidris pusilla (V)
 Western sandpiper, Calidris mauri (V)
 Asian dowitcher, Limnodromus semipalmatus (V)
 Short-billed dowitcher, Limnodromus griseus (V)
 Long-billed dowitcher, Limnodromus scolopaceus (V)
 Jack snipe, Lymnocryptes minimus
 Eurasian woodcock, Scolopax rusticola
 Great snipe, Gallinago media
 Common snipe, Gallinago gallinago
 Wilson's snipe, Gallinago delicata (V)
 Pin-tailed snipe, Gallinago stenura (V)
 African snipe, Gallinago nigripennis (E)
 Madagascar snipe, Gallinago nigripennis (E-Madagascar)
 Terek sandpiper, Xenus cinereus
 Wilson's phalarope, Phalaropus tricolor (V)
 Red-necked phalarope, Phalaropus lobatus
 Red phalarope, Phalaropus fulicarius
 Common sandpiper, Actitis hypoleucos
 Spotted sandpiper, Actitis macularius (V)
 Green sandpiper, Tringa ochropus
 Solitary sandpiper, Tringa solitaria (V)
 Gray-tailed tattler, Tringa brevipes (V)
 Spotted redshank, Tringa erythropus
 Greater yellowlegs, Tringa melanoleuca (V)
 Common greenshank, Tringa nebularia
 Lesser yellowlegs, Tringa flavipes (V)
 Marsh sandpiper, Tringa stagnatilis
 Wood sandpiper, Tringa glareola
 Common redshank, Tringa totanus

Buttonquail
Order: CharadriiformesFamily: Turnicidae

The buttonquail are small, drab, running birds which resemble the true quails. The female is the brighter of the sexes and initiates courtship. The male incubates the eggs and tends the young.

 Small buttonquail, Turnix sylvaticus
 Black-rumped buttonquail, Turnix nanus (E)
 Fynbos buttonquail, Turnix hottentottus (E-South Africa)
 Madagascar buttonquail, Turnix nigricollis (E-Madagascar)
 Quail-plover, Ortyxelos meiffrenii (E)

Crab-plover
Order: CharadriiformesFamily: Dromadidae

The crab-plover is related to the waders. It resembles a plover but with very long grey legs and a strong heavy black bill similar to a tern's. It has black-and-white plumage, a long neck, partially webbed feet, and a bill designed for eating crabs.

 Crab-plover, Dromas ardeola

Pratincoles and coursers
Order: CharadriiformesFamily: Glareolidae

Glareolidae is a family of wading birds comprising the pratincoles, which have short legs, long pointed wings and long forked tails, and the coursers, which have long legs, short wings and long, pointed bills which curve downwards.

 Cream-colored courser, Cursorius cursor
 Somali courser, Cursorius somalensis (E)
 Burchell's courser, Cursorius rufus (E)
 Temminck's courser, Cursorius temminckii (E)
 Double-banded courser, Smutsornis africanus (E)
 Three-banded courser, Rhinoptilus cinctus (E)
 Bronze-winged courser, Rhinoptilus chalcopterus (E)
 Collared pratincole, Glareola pratincola
 Oriental pratincole, Glareola maldivarum
 Black-winged pratincole, Glareola nordmanni
 Madagascar pratincole, Glareola ocularis
 Rock pratincole, Glareola nuchalis (E)
 Gray pratincole, Glareola cinerea (E)

Skuas and jaegers
Order: CharadriiformesFamily: Stercorariidae

The family Stercorariidae are, in general, medium to large birds, typically with grey or brown plumage, often with white markings on the wings. They nest on the ground in temperate and arctic regions and are long-distance migrants.

 Great skua, Stercorarius skua
 South polar skua, Stercorarius maccormicki (V)
 Brown skua, Stercorarius antarcticus
 Pomarine jaeger, Stercorarius pomarinus
 Parasitic jaeger, Stercorarius parasiticus
 Long-tailed jaeger, Stercorarius longicaudus

Auks, murres, and puffins
Order: CharadriiformesFamily: Alcidae

Alcids are superficially similar to penguins due to their black-and-white colors, their upright posture and some of their habits, however they are not related to the penguins and differ in being able to fly. Auks live on the open sea, only deliberately coming ashore to nest.

 Dovekie, Alle alle
 Common murre, Uria aalge
 Razorbill, Alca torda
 Black guillemot, Cepphus grylle (V)
 Atlantic puffin, Fratercula arctica

Gulls, terns, and skimmers
Order: CharadriiformesFamily: Laridae

Laridae is a family of medium to large seabirds, the gulls, terns, and skimmers. Gulls are typically grey or white, often with black markings on the head or wings. They have stout, longish bills and webbed feet. Terns are a group of generally medium to large seabirds typically with grey or white plumage, often with black markings on the head. Most terns hunt fish by diving but some pick insects off the surface of fresh water. Terns are generally long-lived birds, with several species known to live in excess of 30 years. Skimmers are a small family of tropical tern-like birds. They have an elongated lower mandible which they use to feed by flying low over the water surface and skimming the water for small fish.

 Black-legged kittiwake, Rissa tridactyla
 Sabine's gull, Xema sabini
 Slender-billed gull, Chroicocephalus genei
 Bonaparte's gull, Chroicocephalus philadelphia (V)
 Gray-hooded gull, Chroicocephalus cirrocephalus
 Hartlaub's gull, Chroicocephalus hartlaubii
 Black-headed gull, Chroicocephalus ridibundus
 Brown-headed gull, Chroicocephalus brunnicephalus
 Little gull, Hydrocoloeus minutus
 Laughing gull, Leucophaeus atricilla (V)
 Franklin's gull, Leucophaeus pipixcan (V)
 Mediterranean gull, Ichthyaetus melanocephalus
 White-eyed gull, Ichthyaetus leucophthalmus
 Sooty gull, Ichthyaetus hemprichii
 Pallas's gull, Ichthyaetus ichthyaetus
 Audouin's gull, Ichthyaetus  audouinii
 Common gull, Larus canus
 Ring-billed gull, Larus delawarensis (V)
 Herring gull, Larus argentatus (V)
 Yellow-legged gull, Larus michahellis
 Caspian gull, Larus cachinnans
 Armenian gull, Larus armenicus
 Iceland gull, Larus glaucoides (V)
 Lesser black-backed gull, Larus fuscus
 Glaucous-winged gull, Larus glaucescens (V)
 Glaucous gull, Larus hyperboreus (V)
 Great black-backed gull, Larus marinus (V)
 Kelp gull, Larus dominicanus
 Brown noddy, Anous stolidus
 Black noddy, Anous minutus
 Lesser noddy, Anous tenuirostris
 White tern, Gygis alba (V)
 Sooty tern, Onychoprion fuscata
 Bridled tern, Onychoprion anaethetus
 Little tern, Sternula albifrons
 Saunders's tern, Sternula saundersi
 Damara tern, Sterna balaenarum (E)
 Gull-billed tern, Gelochelidon nilotica
 Caspian tern, Hydroprogne caspia
 Black tern, Chlidonias niger
 White-winged tern, Chlidonias leucopterus
 Whiskered tern, Chlidonias hybrida
 Roseate tern, Sterna dougallii
 Black-naped tern, Sterna sumatrana
 Common tern, Sterna hirundo
 Arctic tern, Sterna paradisaea
 Antarctic tern, Sterna vittata
 White-cheeked tern, Sterna repressa
 Great crested tern, Sterna bergii
 Sandwich tern, Sterna sandvicensis
 Elegant tern, Thalasseus elegans (V)
 Lesser crested tern, Sterna bengalensis
 West African crested tern, Thalasseus albididorsalis
 Black skimmer, Rynchops niger (V)
 African skimmer, Rynchops flavirostris

Tropicbirds
Order: PhaethontiformesFamily: Phaethontidae

Tropicbirds are slender white birds of tropical oceans, with exceptionally long central tail feathers. Their heads and long wings have black markings.

 White-tailed tropicbird, Phaethon lepturus
 Red-billed tropicbird, Phaethon aethereus
 Red-tailed tropicbird, Phaethon rubricauda

Loons
Order: GaviiformesFamily: Gaviidae

Loons, known as divers in Europe, are a group of aquatic birds found in many parts of North America and northern Europe. They are the size of a large duck or small goose, which they somewhat resemble when swimming, but to which they are completely unrelated.

 Red-throated loon, Gavia stellata (V)
 Arctic loon, Gavia arctica (V)
 Common loon, Gavia immer (V)
 Yellow-billed loon, Gavia adamsii (V)

Penguins
Order: SphenisciformesFamily: Spheniscidae

The penguins are a group of aquatic, flightless birds living almost exclusively in the Southern Hemisphere. Most penguins feed on krill, fish, squid and other forms of sealife caught while swimming underwater.

 King penguin, Aptenodytes patagonicus (V)
 Gentoo penguin, Pygoscelis papua (V)
 African penguin, Spheniscus demersus 
 Macaroni penguin, Eudyptes chrysolophus (V)
 Southern rockhopper penguin, Eudyptes chrysocome (V)
 Moseley's rockhopper penguin, Eudyptes moseleyi (V)

Albatrosses
Order: ProcellariiformesFamily: Diomedeidae

The albatrosses are among the largest of flying birds, and the great albatrosses of the genus Diomedea have the largest wingspans of any extant birds.

 Yellow-nosed albatross, Thalassarche chlororhynchos
 Gray-headed albatross, Thalassarche chrysostoma
 Buller's albatross, Thalassarche bulleri (V)
 white-capped albatross, Thalassarche cauta
 Salvin's albatross, Thalassarche salvini
 Chatham albatross, Thalassarche eremita (V)
 Black-browed albatross, Thalassarche melanophris
 Sooty albatross, Phoebetria fusca
 Light-mantled albatross, Phoebetria palpebrata
 Royal albatross, Diomedea epomophora
 Wandering albatross, Diomedea exulans
 Laysan albatross, Phoebastria immutabilis (V)

Southern storm-petrels
Order: ProcellariiformesFamily: Oceanitidae

The storm-petrels are the smallest seabirds, relatives of the petrels, feeding on planktonic crustaceans and small fish picked from the surface, typically while hovering. The flight is fluttering and sometimes bat-like. Until 2018, this family's species were included with the other storm-petrels in family Hydrobatidae.

 Wilson's storm-petrel, Oceanites oceanicus
 Gray-backed storm-petrel, Garrodia nereis (V)
 White-faced storm-petrel, Pelagodroma marina
 White-bellied storm-petrel, Fregetta grallaria (V)
 Black-bellied storm-petrel, Fregetta tropica

Northern storm-petrels
Order: ProcellariiformesFamily: Hydrobatidae

Though the members of this family are similar in many respects to the southern storm-petrels, including their general appearance and habits, there are enough genetic differences to warrant their placement in a separate family.

 European storm-petrel, Hydrobates pelagicus (V)
 Leach's storm-petrel, Hydrobates leucorhous
 Swinhoe's storm-petrel, Hydrobates monorhis
 Band-rumped storm-petrel, Hydrobates castro
 Cape Verde storm-petrel, Hydrobates jabejabe
 Matsudaira's storm-petrel, Hydrobates matsudairae (V)

Shearwaters and petrels
Order: ProcellariiformesFamily: Procellariidae

The procellariids are the main group of medium-sized "true petrels", characterised by united nostrils with medium septum and a long outer functional primary.

 Southern giant-petrel, Macronectes giganteus
 Northern giant-petrel, Macronectes halli
 Northern fulmar, Fulmarus glacialis (V)
 Southern fulmar, Fulmarus glacialoides
 Antarctic petrel, Thalassoica antarctica (V)
 Cape petrel, Daption capense
 Snow petrel, Pagodroma nivea (V)
 Kerguelen petrel, Lugensa brevirostris
 Large St. Helena petrel, Pterodroma rupinarum (E-St. Helena) Extinct
 Great-winged petrel, Pterodroma macroptera
 Gray-faced petrel, Pterodroma gouldi (V)
 Kermadec petrel, Pterodroma neglecta (V)
 Trindade petrel, Pterodroma arminjoniana
 Herald petrel, Pterodroma heraldica
 Murphy's petrel, Pterodroma ultima (V)
 Zino's petrel, Pterodroma madeira
 Fea's petrel, Pterodroma feae
 Soft-plumaged petrel, Pterodroma mollis
 Barau's petrel, Pterodroma baraui (V)
 White-headed petrel, Pterodroma lessonii (V)
 Black-capped petrel, Pterodroma hasitata (V)
 Atlantic petrel, Pterodroma incerta (V)
 Blue petrel, Halobaena caerulea (V)
 Fairy prion, Pachyptila turtur (V)
 Broad-billed prion, Pachyptila vittata
 Salvin's prion, Pachyptila salvini
 MacGillivray’s prion, Pachyptila macgillivrayi
 Antarctic prion, Pachyptila desolata
 Slender-billed prion, Pachyptila belcheri (V)
 Fulmar prion, Pachyptila crassirostris (V)
 Bulwer's petrel, Bulweria bulwerii
 Jouanin's petrel, Bulweria fallax
 Small St. Helena petrel, Bulweria bifax (E-St. Helena) Extinct
 Mascarene petrel, Pseudobulweria aterrima
 Tahiti petrel, Pseudobulweria rostrata
 Gray petrel, Procellaria cinerea
 White-chinned petrel, Procellaria aequinoctialis
 Spectacled petrel, Procellaria conspicillata
 Streaked shearwater, Calonectris leucomelas (V)
 Cory's shearwater, Calonectris diomedea
 Cape Verde shearwater, Calonectris edwardsii
 Flesh-footed shearwater, Ardenna carneipes
 Great shearwater, Ardenna gravis
 Wedge-tailed shearwater, Ardenna pacifica
 Sooty shearwater, Ardenna grisea
 Short-tailed shearwater, Ardenna tenuirostris (V)
 Manx shearwater, Puffinus puffinus
 Yelkouan shearwater, Puffinus yelkouan
 Balearic shearwater, Puffinus mauretanicus
 Little shearwater, Puffinus assimilis
 Subantarctic shearwater, Puffinus elegans
 Barolo shearwater, Puffinus baroli
 Boyd's shearwater, Puffinus boydi (E)
 Tropical shearwater, Puffinus bailloni
 Persian shearwater, Puffinus persicus
 Common diving-petrel, Pelecanoides urinatrix (V)

Storks
Order: CiconiiformesFamily: Ciconiidae

Storks are large, long-legged, long-necked, wading birds with long, stout bills. Storks are mute, but bill-clattering is an important mode of communication at the nest. Their nests can be large and may be reused for many years. Many species are migratory.

 African openbill, Anastomus lamelligerus
 Black stork, Ciconia nigra
 Abdim's stork, Ciconia abdimii
 African woolly-necked stork, Ciconia microscelis
 White stork, Ciconia ciconia
 Saddle-billed stork, Ephippiorhynchus senegalensis (E)
 Marabou stork, Leptoptilos crumenifer
 Yellow-billed stork, Mycteria ibis

Frigatebirds
Order: SuliformesFamily: Fregatidae

Frigatebirds are large seabirds usually found over tropical oceans. They are large, black-and-white, or completely black, with long wings and deeply forked tails. The males have colored inflatable throat pouches. They do not swim or walk and cannot take off from a flat surface. Having the largest wingspan-to-body-weight ratio of any bird, they are essentially aerial, able to stay aloft for more than a week.

 Lesser frigatebird, Fregata ariel
 Ascension frigatebird, Fregata aquila (V)
 Magnificent frigatebird, Fregata magnificens
 Christmas Island frigatebird, Fregata andrewsi (V)
 Great frigatebird, Fregata minor

Boobies and gannets
Order: SuliformesFamily: Sulidae

The sulids comprise the gannets and boobies. Both groups are medium to large coastal seabirds that plunge-dive for fish.

 Masked booby, Sula dactylatra
 Brown booby, Sula leucogaster
 Red-footed booby, Sula sula (V)
 Abbott's booby, Papasula abbotti
 Northern gannet, Morus bassanus
 Cape gannet, Morus capensis
 Australasian gannet, Morus serrator

Anhingas
Order: SuliformesFamily: Anhingidae

Anhingas or darters are often called "snake-birds" because of their long thin neck, which gives a snake-like appearance when they swim with their bodies submerged. The males have black and dark-brown plumage, an erectile crest on the nape and a larger bill than the female. The females have much paler plumage especially on the neck and underparts. The darters have completely webbed feet and their legs are short and set far back on the body. Their plumage is somewhat permeable, like that of cormorants, and they spread their wings to dry after diving.

 African darter, Anhinga rufa
 Oriental darter, Anhinga melanogaster (V)

Cormorants and shags
Order: SuliformesFamily: Phalacrocoracidae

Phalacrocoracidae is a family of medium to large coastal, fish-eating seabirds that includes cormorants and shags. Plumage colouration varies, with the majority having mainly dark plumage, some species being black-and-white and a few being colourful.

 Long-tailed cormorant, Microcarbo africanus
 Crowned cormorant, Microcarbo coronatus (E)
 Pygmy cormorant, Microcarbo pygmeus (V)
 Bank cormorant, Phalacrocorax neglectus (E)
 Cape cormorant, Phalacrocorax capensis (E)
 Great cormorant, Phalacrocorax carbo
 Socotra cormorant, Phalacrocorax nigrogularis
 European shag, Phalacrocorax aristotelis

Pelicans
Order: PelecaniformesFamily: Pelecanidae

Pelicans are large water birds with a distinctive pouch under their beak. As with other members of the order Pelecaniformes, they have webbed feet with four toes.

 Great white pelican, Pelecanus onocrotalus
 Pink-backed pelican, Pelecanus rufescens
 Dalmatian pelican, Pelecanus crispus

Shoebill

Order: PelecaniformesFamily: Balaenicipitidae

The shoebill was formerly thought to be related to storks but is in the same order as pelicans. It derives its name from its massive shoe-shaped bill.

 Shoebill, Balaeniceps rex (E)

Hamerkop

Order: PelecaniformesFamily: Scopidae

The hammerkop is a medium-sized bird with a long shaggy crest. The shape of its head with a curved bill and crest at the back is reminiscent of a hammer, hence its name. Its plumage is drab-brown all over.

 Hamerkop, Scopus umbretta

Herons, egrets, and bitterns

Order: PelecaniformesFamily: Ardeidae

The family Ardeidae contains the bitterns, herons and egrets. Herons and egrets are medium to large wading birds with long necks and legs. Bitterns tend to be shorter necked and more wary. Members of Ardeidae fly with their necks retracted, unlike other long-necked birds such as storks, ibises and spoonbills.

 American bittern, Botaurus lentiginosus (V)
 Great bittern, Botaurus stellaris
 Yellow bittern, Ixobrychus sinensis (V)
 Little bittern, Ixobrychus minutus
 Schrenck's bittern, Ixobrychus eurhythmus (V)
 Cinnamon bittern, Ixobrychus cinnamomeus (V)
 Dwarf bittern, Ixobrychus sturmii (V)
 Least bittern, Ixobrychus exilis (V)
 White-crested bittern, Tigriornis leucolopha (E)
 Great blue heron, Ardea herodias (V)
 Gray heron, Ardea cinerea
 Black-headed heron, Ardea melanocephala
 Humblot's heron, Ardea humbloti
 Goliath heron, Ardea goliath
 Purple heron, Ardea purpurea
 Great egret, Ardea alba
 Intermediate egret, Ardea intermedia
 Little egret, Egretta garzetta
 Western reef-heron, Egretta gularis
 Snowy egret, Egretta thula (V)
 Little blue heron, Egretta caerulea (V)
 Slaty egret, Egretta vinaceigula (E)
 Black heron, Egretta ardesiaca
 Cattle egret, Bubulcus ibis
 Squacco heron, Ardeola ralloides
 Indian pond-heron, Ardeola grayii (V)
 Malagasy pond-heron, Ardeola idae
 Rufous-bellied heron, Ardeola rufiventris (E)
 Striated heron, Butorides striata
 Reunion night-heron, Nycticorax duboisi (E-Réunion) Extinct
 Mauritius night-heron, Nycticorax mauritianus (E-Mauritius) Extinct
 Rodrigues night-heron, Nycticorax megacephalus (E-Rodrigues) Extinct
 Black-crowned night-heron, Nycticorax nycticorax
 White-backed night-heron, Gorsachius leuconotus (E)

Ibises and spoonbills
Order: PelecaniformesFamily: Threskiornithidae

Threskiornithidae is a family of large terrestrial and wading birds which includes the ibises and spoonbills. They have long, broad wings with 11 primary and about 20 secondary feathers. They are strong fliers and despite their size and weight, very capable soarers.

 Glossy ibis, Plegadis falcinellus
 Madagascar ibis, Lophotibis cristata (E-Madagascar)
 African sacred ibis, Threskiornis aethiopicus
 Malagasy sacred ibis, Threskiornis bernieri
 Reunion ibis, Threskiornis solitarius (E-Réunion) Extinct
 Northern bald ibis, Geronticus eremita
 Southern bald ibis, Geronticus calvus (E)
 Olive ibis, Bostrychia olivacea (E)
 Sao Tome ibis, Bostrychia bocagei (E-São Tomé and Príncipe)
 Spot-breasted ibis, Bostrychia rara (E)
 Hadada ibis, Bostrychia hagedash (E)
 Wattled ibis, Bostrychia carunculata (E)
 Eurasian spoonbill, Platalea leucorodia
 African spoonbill, Platalea alba

Secretarybird

Order: AccipitriformesFamily: Sagittariidae

The secretarybird is a bird of prey in the order Accipitriformes but is easily distinguished from other raptors by its long crane-like legs.

 Secretarybird, Sagittarius serpentarius (E)

Osprey
Order: AccipitriformesFamily: Pandionidae

The family Pandionidae contains only one species, the osprey. The osprey is a medium-large raptor which is a specialist fish-eater with a worldwide distribution.

 Osprey, Pandion haliaetus

Hawks, eagles, and kites

Order: AccipitriformesFamily: Accipitridae

Accipitridae is a family of birds of prey, which includes hawks, eagles, kites, harriers and Old World vultures. These birds have powerful hooked beaks for tearing flesh from their prey, strong legs, powerful talons and keen eyesight.

 Black-winged kite, Elanus caeruleus
 Black-shouldered kite, Elanus axillaris (V)
 Scissor-tailed kite, Chelictinia riocourii
 African harrier-hawk, Polyboroides typus (E)
 Palm-nut vulture, Gypohierax angolensis (E)
 Madagascar serpent-eagle, Eutriorchis astur (E-Madagascar)
 Bearded vulture, Gypaetus barbatus
 Egyptian vulture, Neophron percnopterus
 European honey-buzzard, Pernis apivorus
 Oriental honey-buzzard, Pernis ptilorhynchus (V)
 African cuckoo-hawk, Aviceda cuculoides (E)
 Madagascar cuckoo-hawk, Aviceda madagascariensis (E-Madagascar)
 White-headed vulture, Trigonoceps occipitalis (E)
 Cinereous vulture, Aegypius monachus
 Lappet-faced vulture, Torgos tracheliotos
 Hooded vulture, Necrosyrtes monachus
 White-backed vulture, Gyps africanus (E)
 Rüppell's griffon, Gyps rueppelli
 Eurasian griffon, Gyps fulvus
 Cape griffon, Gyps coprotheres (E)
 Bateleur, Terathopius ecaudatus
 Congo serpent-eagle, Dryotriorchis spectabilis (E)
 Short-toed snake-eagle, Circaetus gallicus
 Beaudouin's snake-eagle, Circaetus beaudouini (E)
 Black-chested snake-eagle, Circaetus pectoralis (E)
 Brown snake-eagle, Circaetus cinereus (E)
 Fasciated snake-eagle, Circaetus fasciolatus (E)
 Banded snake-eagle, Circaetus cinerascens (E)
 Bat hawk, Macheiramphus alcinus
 Crowned eagle, Stephanoaetus coronatus (E)
 Martial eagle, Polemaetus bellicosus (E)
 Long-crested eagle, Lophaetus occipitalis
 Lesser spotted eagle, Clanga pomarina
 Greater spotted eagle, Clanga clanga
 Wahlberg's eagle, Hieraaetus wahlbergi (E)
 Booted eagle, Hieraaetus pennatus
 Ayres's hawk-eagle, Hieraaetus ayresii (E)
 Tawny eagle, Aquila rapax
 Steppe eagle, Aquila nipalensis
 Spanish eagle, Aquila adalberti extirpated
 Imperial eagle, Aquila heliaca
 Golden eagle, Aquila chrysaetos
 Cassin's hawk-eagle, Aquila africana (E)
 Verreaux's eagle, Aquila verreauxii
 Bonelli's eagle, Aquila fasciata
 African hawk-eagle, Aquila spilogaster (E)
 Lizard buzzard, Kaupifalco monogrammicus (E)
 Dark chanting-goshawk, Melierax metabates
 Eastern chanting-goshawk, Melierax poliopterus (E)
 Pale chanting-goshawk, Melierax canorus (E)
 Gabar goshawk, Micronisus gabar
 Grasshopper buzzard, Butastur rufipennis
 Eurasian marsh-harrier, Circus aeruginosus
 African marsh-harrier, Circus ranivorus (E)
 Reunion harrier, Circus maillardi (E-Reunion)
 Malagasy harrier, Circus macrosceles 
 Black harrier, Circus maurus (E)
 Hen harrier, Circus cyaneus
 Pallid harrier, Circus macrourus
 Montagu's harrier, Circus pygargus
 African goshawk, Accipiter tachiro (E)
 Chestnut-flanked sparrowhawk, Accipiter castanilius (E)
 Shikra, Accipiter badius
 Levant sparrowhawk, Accipiter brevipes
 Frances's sparrowhawk, Accipiter francesiae
 Red-thighed sparrowhawk, Accipiter erythropus (E)
 Little sparrowhawk, Accipiter minullus (E)
 Madagascar sparrowhawk, Accipiter madagascariensis (E-Madagascar)
 Ovambo sparrowhawk, Accipiter ovampensis (E)
 Eurasian sparrowhawk, Accipiter nisus
 Rufous-breasted sparrowhawk, Accipiter rufiventris (E)
 Black goshawk, Accipiter melanoleucus (E)
 Henst's goshawk, Accipiter henstii (E-Madagascar)
 Northern goshawk, Accipiter gentilis
 Long-tailed hawk, Urotriorchis macrourus (E)
 Red kite, Milvus milvus
 Black kite, Milvus migrans
 White-tailed eagle, Haliaeetus albicilla (V)
 White-bellied sea-eagle, Haliaeetus leucogaster (V)
 African fish-eagle, Haliaeetus vocifer (E)
 Madagascar fish-eagle, Haliaeetus vociferoides (E-Madagascar)
 Rough-legged hawk, Buteo lagopus (V)
 Common buzzard, Buteo buteo
 Mountain buzzard, Buteo oreophilus (E)
 Forest buzzard, Buteo trizonatus (E)
 Madagascar buzzard, Buteo brachypterus (E-Madagascar)
 Long-legged buzzard, Buteo rufinus
 Red-necked buzzard, Buteo auguralis (E)
 Augur buzzard, Buteo augur (E)
 Jackal buzzard, Buteo rufofuscus (E)

Barn-owls
Order: StrigiformesFamily: Tytonidae

Barn-owls are medium to large owls with large heads and characteristic heart-shaped faces. They have long strong legs with powerful talons.

 African grass-owl, Tyto capensis (E)
 Barn owl, Tyto alba
 Red owl, Tyto soumagnei (E-Madagascar)
 Congo bay-owl, Phodilus prigoginei (E-Democratic Republic of the Congo)

Owls
Order: StrigiformesFamily: Strigidae

The typical owls are small to large solitary nocturnal birds of prey. They have large forward-facing eyes and ears, a hawk-like beak and a conspicuous circle of feathers around each eye called a facial disk.

 Sandy scops-owl, Otus icterorhynchus (E)
 Sokoke scops-owl, Otus ireneae (E)
 Eurasian scops-owl, Otus scops
 Pemba scops-owl, Otus pembaensis (E-Tanzania)
 Sao Tome scops-owl, Otus hartlaubi (E-São Tomé and Príncipe)
 African scops-owl, Otus senegalensis
 Pallid scops-owl, Otus brucei
 Moheli scops-owl, Otus moheliensis (E-Comoro Islands)
 Comoro scops-owl, Otus pauliani (E-Comoro Islands)
 Seychelles scops-owl, Otus insularis (E-Seychelles)
 Anjouan scops-owl, Otus capnodes (E-Comoro Islands)
 Mayotte scops-owl, Otus mayottensis (E-Comoro Islands)
 Réunion scops-owl, Otus grucheti (E-Réunion) extinct
 Rodrigues scops-owl, Otus murivorus (E-Rodrigues) extinct
 Mauritius scops-owl, Otus sauzieri (E-Mauritius) extinct
 Madagascar scops-owl, Otus rutilus (E-Madagascar)
 Northern white-faced owl, Ptilopsis leucotis (E)
 Southern white-faced owl, Ptilopsis granti (E)
 Maned owl, Jubula lettii (E)
 Eurasian eagle-owl, Bubo bubo
 Pharaoh eagle-owl, Bubo ascalaphus
 Cape eagle-owl, Bubo capensis (E)
 Spotted eagle-owl, Bubo africanus
 Grayish eagle-owl, Bubo cinerascens (E)
 Fraser's eagle-owl, Bubo poensis (E)
 Shelley's eagle-owl, Bubo shelleyi (E)
 Verreaux's eagle-owl, Bubo lacteus (E)
 Akun eagle-owl, Bubo leucostictus (E)
 Brown fish-owl, Ketupa zeylonensis (V)
 Pel's fishing-owl, Scotopelia peli (E)
 Rufous fishing-owl, Scotopelia ussheri (E)
 Vermiculated fishing-owl, Scotopelia bouvieri (E)
 Pearl-spotted owlet, Glaucidium perlatum (E)
 Red-chested owlet, Glaucidium tephronotum (E)
 Sjöstedt's owlet, Glaucidium sjostedti (E)
 African barred owlet, Glaucidium capense (E)
 Albertine owlet, Glaucidium albertinum (E)
 Little owl, Athene noctua
 White-browed owl, Athene superciliaris (E-Madagascar)
 Maghreb owl, Strix mauritanica (E)
 Desert owl, Strix hadorami
 African wood-owl, Strix woodfordii (E)
 Long-eared owl, Asio otus
 Abyssinian owl, Asio abyssinicus (E)
 Madagascar owl, Asio madagascariensis (E-Madagascar)
 Short-eared owl, Asio flammeus
 Marsh owl, Asio capensis

Mousebirds
Order: ColiiformesFamily: Coliidae

The mousebirds are slender greyish or brown birds with soft, hairlike body feathers and very long thin tails. They are arboreal and scurry through the leaves like rodents in search of berries, fruit and buds. They are acrobatic and can feed upside down. All species have strong claws and reversible outer toes. They also have crests and stubby bills. These six species are endemic to Africa.

 Speckled mousebird, Colius striatus
 White-headed mousebird, Colius leucocephalus
 Red-backed mousebird, Colius castanotus
 White-backed mousebird, Colius colius
 Blue-naped mousebird, Urocolius macrourus
 Red-faced mousebird, Urocolius indicus

Cuckoo-roller
Order: LeptosomiformesFamily: Leptosomidae

The cuckoo roller or courol (Leptosomus discolor) is the only bird in the family Leptosomidae, which was previously often placed in the order Coraciiformes but is now placed in its own order Leptosomiformes. Its nearest relative is not clear.

 Cuckoo-roller,Leptosomus discolor

Trogons
Order: TrogoniformesFamily: Trogonidae

The family Trogonidae includes trogons and quetzals. Found in tropical woodlands worldwide, they feed on insects and fruit, and their broad bills and weak legs reflect their diet and arboreal habits. Although their flight is fast, they are reluctant to fly any distance. Trogons have soft, often colourful, feathers with distinctive male and female plumage.

 Narina trogon, Apaloderma narina (E)
 Bare-cheeked trogon, Apaloderma aequatoriale (E)
 Bar-tailed trogon, Apaloderma vittatum (E)

Hoopoes
Order: BucerotiformesFamily: Upupidae

Hoopoes have black, white and orangey-pink coloring with a large erectile crest on their head.

 Eurasian hoopoe, Upupa epops
 Madagascar hoopoe, Upupa marginata (E-Madagascar)
 St. Helena hoopoe, Upupa antaios (E-St. Helena) extinct

Woodhoopoes and scimitarbills
Order: BucerotiformesFamily: Phoeniculidae

The woodhoopoes and scimitarbills are related to the hoopoes, ground-hornbills, and hornbills. They most resemble the hoopoes with their long curved bills, used to probe for insects, and short rounded wings. However, they differ in that they have metallic plumage, often blue, green or purple, and lack an erectile crest. The entire family is endemic to Africa.

 Green woodhoopoe, Phoeniculus purpureus
 Violet woodhoopoe, Phoeniculus damarensis
 Black-billed woodhoopoe, Phoeniculus somaliensis
 White-headed woodhoopoe, Phoeniculus bollei
 Forest woodhoopoe, Phoeniculus castaneiceps
 Black scimitarbill, Rhinopomastus aterrimus
 Common scimitarbill, Rhinopomastus cyanomelas
 Abyssinian scimitarbill, Rhinopomastus minor

Ground-hornbills
Order: BucerotiformesFamily: Bucorvidae

The ground-hornbills are terrestrial birds which feed almost entirely on insects, other birds, snakes, and amphibians. The entire family is endemic to Africa.

 Abyssinian ground-hornbill, Bucorvus abyssinicus
 Southern ground-hornbill, Bucorvus leadbeateri

Hornbills
Order: BucerotiformesFamily: Bucerotidae

Hornbills are a group of birds whose bill is shaped like a cow's horn, but without a twist, sometimes with a casque on the upper mandible. Frequently, the bill is brightly colored.

 Red-billed dwarf hornbill, Lophoceros camurus (E)
 Crowned hornbill, Lophoceros alboterminatus (E)
 Bradfield's hornbill, Lophoceros bradfieldi (E)
 African pied hornbill, Lophoceros fasciatus (E)
 Hemprich's hornbill, Lophoceros hemprichii (E)
 African gray hornbill, Lophoceros nasutus
 Pale-billed hornbill, Lophoceros pallidirostris (E)
 Eastern yellow-billed hornbill, Tockus flavirostris (E)
 Southern yellow-billed hornbill, Tockus leucomelas (E)
 Jackson's hornbill, Tockus jacksoni (E)
 Von der Decken's hornbill, Tockus deckeni (E)
 Monteiro's hornbill, Tockus monteiri (E)
 Southern red-billed hornbill, Tockus rufirostris (E)
 Damara red-billed hornbill, Tockus damarensis (E)
 Tanzanian red-billed hornbill, Tockus ruahae (E-Tanzania)
 Western red-billed hornbill, Tockus kempi (E)
 Northern red-billed hornbill, Tockus erythrorhynchus (E)
 White-crested hornbill, Horizocerus albocristatus (E)
 Black dwarf hornbill, Horizocerus hartlaubi (E)
 Black-casqued hornbill, Ceratogymna atrata (E)
 Yellow-casqued hornbill, Ceratogymna elata (E)
 Silvery-cheeked hornbill, Bycanistes brevis (E)
 Black-and-white-casqued hornbill, Bycanistes subcylindrica (E)
 Brown-cheeked hornbill, Bycanistes cylindrica (E)
 White-thighed hornbill, Bycanistes albotibialis (E)
 Trumpeter hornbill, Bycanistes bucinator (E)
 Piping hornbill, Bycanistes fistulator (E)

Kingfishers
Order: CoraciiformesFamily: Alcedinidae

Kingfishers are medium-sized birds with large heads, long, pointed bills, short legs and stubby tails.

 Common kingfisher, Alcedo atthis
 Half-collared kingfisher, Alcedo semitorquata (E)
 Shining-blue kingfisher, Alcedo quadribrachys (E)
 Malachite kingfisher, Corythornis cristatus
 Malagasy kingfisher, Corythornis vintsioides
 White-bellied kingfisher, Corythornis leucogaster (E)
 Madagascar pygmy kingfisher, Corythornis madagascariensis (E-Madagascar)
 African pygmy kingfisher, Ispidina picta (E)
 African dwarf kingfisher, Ispidina lecontei (E)
 Chocolate-backed kingfisher, Halcyon badia (E)
 White-throated kingfisher, Halcyon smyrnensis (V)
 Gray-headed kingfisher, Halcyon leucocephala
 Woodland kingfisher, Halcyon senegalensis (E)
 Mangrove kingfisher, Halcyon senegaloides (E)
 Blue-breasted kingfisher, Halcyon malimbica (E)
 Brown-hooded kingfisher, Halcyon albiventris (E)
 Striped kingfisher, Halcyon chelicuti (E)
 Collared kingfisher, Todiramphus chloris
 Giant kingfisher, Megaceryle maximus (E)
 Pied kingfisher, Ceryle rudis

Bee-eaters
Order: CoraciiformesFamily: Meropidae

The bee-eaters are a group of near passerine birds in the family Meropidae. Most species are found in Africa but others occur in southern Europe, Madagascar, Australia and New Guinea. They are characterised by richly colored plumage, slender bodies and usually elongated central tail feathers. All are colourful and have long downturned bills and pointed wings, which give them a swallow-like appearance when seen from afar.

 Black bee-eater, Merops gularis (E)
 Blue-moustached bee-eater, Merops mentalis (E)
 Blue-headed bee-eater, Merops muelleri (E)
 Red-throated bee-eater, Merops bulocki (E)
 White-fronted bee-eater, Merops bullockoides (E)
 Little bee-eater, Merops pusillus
 Blue-breasted bee-eater, Merops variegatus (E)
 Ethiopian bee-eater, Merops lafresnayii (E)
 Cinnamon-chested bee-eater, Merops oreobates (E)
 Swallow-tailed bee-eater, Merops hirundineus (E)
 Black-headed bee-eater, Merops breweri (E)
 Somali bee-eater, Merops revoilii
 White-throated bee-eater, Merops albicollis
 African green bee-eater, Merops viridissimus
 Böhm's bee-eater, Merops boehmi (E)
 Blue-cheeked bee-eater, Merops persicus
 Madagascar bee-eater, Merops superciliosus
 European bee-eater, Merops apiaster
 Rosy bee-eater, Merops malimbicus (E)
 Northern carmine bee-eater, Merops nubicus (E)
 Southern carmine bee-eater, Merops nubicoides (E)

Rollers
Order: CoraciiformesFamily: Coraciidae

Rollers resemble crows in size and build, but are more closely related to the kingfishers and bee-eaters. They share the colourful appearance of those groups with blues and browns predominating. The two inner front toes are connected, but the outer toe is not.

 European roller, Coracias garrulus
 Abyssinian roller, Coracias abyssinicus
 Lilac-breasted roller, Coracias caudatus (E)
 Racket-tailed roller, Coracias spatulatus (E)
 Rufous-crowned roller, Coracias noevius
 Blue-bellied roller, Coracias cyanogaster (E)
 Broad-billed roller, Eurystomus glaucurus
 Blue-throated roller, Eurystomus gularis (E)
 Dollarbird, Eurystomus orientalis

Ground-rollers
Order: CoraciiformesFamily: Brachypteraciidae

The ground-rollers are a small family of non-migratory  near-passerine birds restricted to Madagascar. 
They are related to the kingfishers, bee-eaters and rollers. They most resemble the latter group, and are sometimes considered a sub-family of the true rollers. The entire family is endemic to Madagascar.

 Short-legged ground-roller Brachypteracias leptosomus
 Scaly ground-roller, Brachypteracias squamigera
 Pitta-like ground-roller, Atelornis pittoides
 Rufous-headed ground-roller, Atelornis crossleyi
 Long-tailed ground-roller, Uratelornis chimaera

African barbets
Order: PiciformesFamily: Lybiidae

The African barbets are plump birds, with short necks and large heads. They get their name from the bristles which fringe their heavy bills. Most species are brightly colored. The entire family is endemic to Africa.

 Yellow-billed barbet, Trachyphonus purpuratus
 Crested barbet, Trachyphonus vaillantii
 Red-and-yellow barbet, Trachyphonus erythrocephalus 
 Yellow-breasted barbet, Trachyphonus margaritatus 
 D'Arnaud's barbet, Trachyphonus darnaudii
 Gray-throated barbet, Gymnobucco bonapartei
 Sladen's barbet, Gymnobucco sladeni
 Bristle-nosed barbet, Gymnobucco peli
 Naked-faced barbet, Gymnobucco calvus
 White-eared barbet, Stactolaema leucotis
 Whyte's barbet, Stactolaema whytii
 Anchieta's barbet, Stactolaema anchietae
 Green barbet, Stactolaema olivacea
 Speckled tinkerbird, Pogoniulus scolopaceus
 Green tinkerbird, Pogoniulus simplex
 Moustached tinkerbird, Pogoniulus leucomystax
 Western tinkerbird, Pogoniulus coryphaea
 Red-rumped tinkerbird, Pogoniulus atroflavus
 Yellow-throated tinkerbird, Pogoniulus subsulphureus
 Yellow-rumped tinkerbird, Pogoniulus bilineatus
 Red-fronted tinkerbird, Pogoniulus pusillus
 Yellow-fronted tinkerbird, Pogoniulus chrysoconus 
 Yellow-spotted barbet, Buccanodon duchaillui
 Hairy-breasted barbet, Tricholaema hirsuta
 Red-fronted barbet, Tricholaema diademata
 Miombo barbet, Tricholaema frontata
 Pied barbet, Tricholaema leucomelas
 Spot-flanked barbet, Tricholaema lachrymosa
 Black-throated barbet, Tricholaema melanocephala 
 Banded barbet, Lybius undatus
 Vieillot's barbet, Lybius vieilloti
 White-headed barbet, Lybius leucocephalus
 Chaplin's barbet, Lybius chaplini (E-Zambia)
 Red-faced barbet, Lybius rubrifacies
 Black-billed barbet, Lybius guifsobalito
 Black-collared barbet, Lybius torquatus
 Brown-breasted barbet, Lybius melanopterus
 Black-backed barbet, Lybius minor
 Double-toothed barbet, Lybius bidentatus
 Bearded barbet, Lybius dubius
 Black-breasted barbet, Lybius rolleti

Honeyguides
Order: PiciformesFamily: Indicatoridae

Honeyguides are among the few birds that feed on wax. They are named for the greater honeyguide which leads traditional honey-hunters to bees' nests and, after the hunters have harvested the honey, feeds on the remaining contents of the hive. The entire family is endemic to Africa.

 Cassin's honeyguide, Prodotiscus insignis
 Green-backed honeyguide, Prodotiscus zambesiae
 Wahlberg's honeyguide, Prodotiscus regulus
 Zenker's honeyguide, Melignomon zenkeri
 Yellow-footed honeyguide, Melignomon eisentrauti 
 Dwarf honeyguide, Indicator pumilio
 Willcocks's honeyguide, Indicator willcocksi
 Pallid honeyguide, Indicator meliphilus
 Least honeyguide, Indicator exilis
 Lesser honeyguide, Indicator minor
 Spotted honeyguide, Indicator maculatus
 Scaly-throated honeyguide, Indicator variegatus
 Greater honeyguide, Indicator indicator
 Lyre-tailed honeyguide, Melichneutes robustus

Woodpeckers
Order: PiciformesFamily: Picidae

Woodpeckers are small to medium-sized birds with chisel-like beaks, short legs, stiff tails and long tongues used for capturing insects. Some species have feet with two toes pointing forward and two backward, while several species have only three toes. Many woodpeckers have the habit of tapping noisily on tree trunks with their beaks.

 Eurasian wryneck, Jynx torquilla
 Rufous-necked wryneck, Jynx ruficollis (E)
 African piculet, Verreauxia africana (E)
 Abyssinian woodpecker, Chloropicus abyssinicus (E)
 Melancholy woodpecker, Chloropicus lugubris (E)
 Gabon woodpecker, Chloropicus gabonensis (E)
 Elliot's woodpecker, Chloropicus elliotii (E)
 Little gray woodpecker, Chloropicus elachus (E)
 Speckle-breasted woodpecker, Chloropicus poecilolaemus (E)
 Cardinal woodpecker, Chloropicus fuscescens (E)
 Bearded woodpecker, Chloropicus namaquus (E)
 Fire-bellied woodpecker, Chloropicus pyrrhogaster (E)
 Golden-crowned woodpecker, Chloropicus xantholophus (E)
 Stierling's woodpecker, Chloropicus stierlingi (E)
 Brown-backed woodpecker, Chloropicus obsoletus (E)
 African gray woodpecker, Chloropicus goertae (E)
 Mountain gray woodpecker, Chloropicus spodocephalus (E)
 Olive woodpecker, Chloropicus griseocephalus (E)
 Great spotted woodpecker, Dendrocopos major
 Syrian woodpecker, Dendrocopos syriacus
 Lesser spotted woodpecker, Dryobates minor
 Levaillant's woodpecker, Picus vaillantii(E)
 Ground woodpecker, Geocolaptes olivaceus
 Brown-eared woodpecker, Campethera caroli (E)
 Buff-spotted woodpecker, Campethera nivosa  (E)
 Tullberg's woodpecker, Campethera tullbergi (E)
 Little green woodpecker, Campethera maculosa (E)
 Green-backed woodpecker, Campethera cailliautii (E)
 Nubian woodpecker, Campethera nubica (E)
 Fine-spotted woodpecker, Campethera punctuligera (E)
 Bennett's woodpecker, Campethera bennettii (E)
 Reichenow's woodpecker, Campethera scriptoricauda (E)
 Knysna woodpecker, Campethera notata (E)
 Golden-tailed woodpecker, Campethera abingoni (E)
 Mombasa woodpecker, Campethera mombassica (E)

Falcons and caracaras
Order: FalconiformesFamily: Falconidae

Falconidae is a family of diurnal birds of prey. They differ from hawks, eagles and kites in that they kill with their beaks instead of their talons.

 Pygmy falcon, Polihierax semitorquatus (E)
 Lesser kestrel, Falco naumanni Eurasian kestrel, Falco tinnunculus Rock kestrel, Falco rupicolus (E)
 Malagasy kestrel, Falco newtoni (E)
 Mauritius kestrel, Falco punctatus (E-Mauritius)
 Seychelles kestrel, Falco araeus (E-Seychelles)
 Reunion kestrel, Falco duboisi (E-Réunion)
 Greater kestrel, Falco rupicoloides (E)
 Fox kestrel, Falco alopex (E)
 Gray kestrel, Falco ardosiaceus (E)
 Dickinson's kestrel, Falco dickinsoni (E)
 Banded kestrel, Falco zoniventris (E-Madagascar)
 Red-necked falcon, Falco chicquera Red-footed falcon, Falco vespertinus Amur falcon, Falco amurensis Eleonora's falcon, Falco eleonorae Sooty falcon, Falco concolor Merlin, Falco columbarius Eurasian hobby, Falco subbuteo African hobby, Falco cuvierii (E)
 Lanner falcon, Falco biarmicus Saker falcon, Falco cherrug Peregrine falcon, Falco peregrinus Taita falcon, Falco fasciinucha (E)

Cockatoos
Order: PsittaciformesFamily: Cacatuidae

The cockatoos share many features with other parrots including the characteristic curved beak shape and a zygodactyl foot, with two forward toes and two backwards toes. They differ, however in a number of characteristics, including the often spectacular movable headcrest.

Galah, Eolophus roseicapilla (I)

Old World parrots
Order: PsittaciformesFamily: Psittaculidae

Characteristic features of parrots include a strong curved bill, an upright stance, strong legs, and clawed zygodactyl feet. Many parrots are vividly colored, and some are multi-colored. Old World parrots are found from Africa east across south and southeast Asia and Oceania to Australia and New Zealand.

 Greater vasa parrot, Coracopsis vasa Lesser vasa parrot, Coracopsis nigra 
 Seychelles parrot, Coracopsis barklyi (E-Seychelles)
 Mascarene parrot, Mascarinus mascarin (E-Mascarene) extinct
 Alexandrine parakeet, Psittacula eupatria (V)
 Seychelles parakeet, Psittacula wardi (E-Seychelles) extinct
 Rose-ringed parakeet, Psittacula krameri Echo parakeet, Psittacula eques (E)
 Newton's parakeet, Psittacula exsul (E-Rodrigues) extinct
 Mauritius gray parrot, Lophopsittacus bensoni (E) extinct
 Broad-billed parrot, Lophopsittacus mauritianus (E-Mauritius) extinct
 Rodrigues parrot, Necropsittacus rodricanus (E-Rodrigues) extinct
 Black-collared lovebird, Agapornis swindernianus (E)
 Gray-headed lovebird, Agapornis canus (I)
 Red-headed lovebird, Agapornis pullarius (E)
 Black-winged lovebird, Agapornis taranta (E)
 Rosy-faced lovebird, Agapornis roseicollis Fischer's lovebird, Agapornis fischeri Yellow-collared lovebird, Agapornis personatus (E-Tanzania)
 Lilian's lovebird, Agapornis lilianae (E)
 Black-cheeked lovebird, Agapornis nigrigenis (E)

African and New World parrots
Order: PsittaciformesFamily: Psittacidae

Characteristic features of parrots include a strong curved bill, an upright stance, strong legs, and clawed zygodactyl feet. Many parrots are vividly colored, and some are multi-colored. Most of the more than 150 species in this family are found in the New World.

 Gray parrot, Psittacus erithacus (E)
 Brown-necked parrot, Poicephalus fuscicollis (E)
 Cape parrot, Poicephalus robustus (E-South Africa)
 Red-fronted parrot, Poicephalus gulielmi (E)
 Meyer's parrot, Poicephalus meyeri (E)
 Rüppell's parrot, Poicephalus rueppellii (E)
 Brown-headed parrot, Poicephalus cryptoxanthus (E)
 Niam-Niam parrot, Poicephalus crassus (E)
 Red-bellied parrot, Poicephalus rufiventris (E)
 Senegal parrot, Poicephalus senegalus (E)
 Yellow-fronted parrot, Poicephalus flavifrons (E-Ethiopia)
 Monk parakeet, Myiopsitta monachus (I)
 Dusky parrot, Pionus fuscus (V)

African and green broadbills
Order: PasseriformesFamily: Calyptomenidae

The broadbills are small, brightly colored birds, which feed on fruit and also take insects in flycatcher fashion, snapping their broad bills. Their habitat is canopies of wet forests.

 African broadbill, Smithornis capensis (E)
 Gray-headed broadbill, Smithornis sharpei (E)
 Rufous-sided broadbill, Smithornis rufolateralis (E)

Asian and Grauer's broadbills
Order: PasseriformesFamily: Eurylaimidae

The broadbills are small, brightly colored birds, which feed on fruit and also take insects in flycatcher fashion, snapping their broad bills. Their habitat is canopies of wet forests.

 Grauer's broadbill, Pseudocalyptomena graueri (E)

Asities
Order: PasseriformesFamily: Philepittidae

The asities are a family of birds, Philepittidae, that are endemic to Madagascar. The asities consist of four species in two genera.  The Neodrepanis species are known as sunbird-asities and were formerly known as false sunbirds. They are all endemic to Madagascar.

 Velvet asity, Philepitta castanea Schlegel's asity,Philepitta schlegeli Common sunbird-asity, Neodrepanis coruscans Yellow-bellied sunbird-asity, Neodrepanis hypoxanthusPittas
Order: PasseriformesFamily: Pittidae

Pittas are medium-sized by passerine standards and are stocky, with fairly long, strong legs, short tails and stout bills. Many are brightly colored. They spend the majority of their time on wet forest floors, eating snails, insects and similar invertebrates.

 African pitta, Pitta angolensis (E)
 Green-breasted pitta, Pitta reichenowi (E)

Cuckooshrikes
Order: PasseriformesFamily: Campephagidae

The cuckooshrikes are small to medium-sized passerine birds. They are predominantly greyish with white and black, although some species are brightly colored. All of the listed species are endemic to Africa.

 Comoros cuckooshrike, Coracina cucullata (E-Comoros)
 Madagascar cuckooshrike, Coracina cinerea (E)
 Grauer's cuckooshrike, Coracina graueri Gray cuckooshrike, Coracina caesia White-breasted cuckooshrike, Coracina pectoralis Ghana cuckooshrike, Campephaga lobata Oriole cuckooshrike, Campephaga oriolina Black cuckooshrike, Campephaga flava Petit's cuckooshrike, Campephaga petiti Red-shouldered cuckooshrike, Campephaga phoenicea 
 Purple-throated cuckooshrike, Campephaga quiscalina 
 Reunion cuckooshrike, Lalage newtoni (E-Réunion)
 Mauritius cuckooshrike, Lalage typica (E-Mauritius)
 Blue cuckooshrike, Cyanograucalus azureusVireos, shrike-babblers, and erpornis
Order: PasseriformesFamily: Vireonidae

The vireos are a group of small to medium-sized passerine birds restricted to the New World and Southeast Asia.

 Red-eyed vireo, Vireo olivaceus (V)

Old World orioles
Order: PasseriformesFamily: Oriolidae

The Old World orioles are colourful passerine birds. They are not related to the New World orioles.

 Eurasian golden oriole, Oriolus oriolus African golden oriole, Oriolus auratus (E)
 Green-headed oriole, Oriolus chlorocephalus (E)
 Sao Tome oriole, Oriolus crassirostris (E-São Tomé and Príncipe)
 Western black-headed oriole, Oriolus brachyrhynchus (E)
 Ethiopian black-headed oriole, Oriolus monacha (E)
 African black-headed oriole, Oriolus larvatus (E)
 Black-tailed oriole, Oriolus percivali (E)
 Black-winged oriole, Oriolus nigripennis (E)

Wattle-eyes and batises
Order: PasseriformesFamily: Platysteiridae

The wattle-eyes, or puffback flycatchers, are small stout passerine birds of the African tropics. They get their name from the brightly colored fleshy eye decorations found in most species in this group. The entire family is endemic to Africa.

 White-tailed shrike, Lanioturdus torquatus Brown-throated wattle-eye, Platysteira cyanea White-fronted wattle-eye, Platysteira albifrons Black-throated wattle-eye, Platysteira peltata Banded wattle-eye, Platysteira laticincta (E-Cameroon)
 Chestnut wattle-eye, Platysteira castanea West African wattle-eye, Platysteira hormophora White-spotted wattle-eye, Platysteira tonsa Red-cheeked wattle-eye, Platysteira blissetti Black-necked wattle-eye, Platysteira chalybea Jameson's wattle-eye, Platysteira jamesoni Yellow-bellied wattle-eye, Platysteira concreta Boulton's batis, Batis margaritae Short-tailed batis, Batis mixta Dark batis, Batis crypta Rwenzori batis, Batis diops Cape batis, Batis capensis Woodward's batis, Batis fratrum Chinspot batis, Batis molitor Pale batis, Batis soror Pririt batis, Batis pririt Senegal batis, Batis senegalensis Gray-headed batis, Batis orientalis Western black-headed batis, Batis erlangeri Eastern black-headed batis, Batis minor Pygmy batis, Batis perkeo Verreaux's batis, Batis minima Ituri batis, Batis ituriensis Bioko batis, Batis poensis (E-Equatorial Guinea)
 West African batis, Batis occulta Angola batis, Batis minullaVangas, helmetshrikes, and allies
Order: PasseriformesFamily: Vangidae

The helmetshrikes are similar in build to the shrikes, but tend to be colourful species with distinctive crests or other head ornaments, such as wattles, from which they get their name. All of the listed species are endemic to Africa.

 White helmetshrike, Prionops plumatus Gray-crested helmetshrike, Prionops poliolophus Yellow-crested helmetshrike, Prionops alberti Red-billed helmetshrike, Prionops caniceps Rufous-bellied helmetshrike, Prionops rufiventris 
 Retz's helmetshrike, Prionops retzii Angola helmetshrike, Prionops gabela Chestnut-fronted helmetshrike, Prionops scopifrons 
 African shrike-flycatcher, Megabyas flammulatus Black-and-white shrike-flycatcher, Bias musicus 
 Archbold's newtonia, Newtonia archboldi (E-Madagascar)
 Common newtonia, Newtonia brunneicauda (E-Madagascar)
 Dark newtonia, Newtonia amphichroa (E-Madagascar)
 Red-tailed newtonia, Newtonia fanovanae (E-Madagascar)
 Tylas vanga, Tylas eduardi (E-Madagascar)
 Red-tailed vanga, Calicalicus madagascariensis (E-Madagascar)
 Red-shouldered vanga, Calicalicus rufocarpalis (E-Madagascar)
 Nuthatch-vanga, Hypositta corallirostris (E-Madagascar)
 Chabert vanga, Leptopterus chabert (E-Madagascar)
 Crossley's vanga, Mystacornis crossleyi (E-Madagascar)
 Blue vanga, Cyanolanius madagascarinus (E)
 Hook-billed vanga, Vanga curvirostris (E-Madagascar)
 Ward's flycatcher, Pseudobias wardi (E-Madagascar)
 Rufous vanga, Schetba rufa (E-Madagascar)
 Helmet vanga, Euryceros prevostii (E-Madagascar)
 Bernier's vanga, Oriolia bernieri (E-Madagascar)
 Sickle-billed vanga, Falculea palliata (E-Madagascar)
 White-headed vanga, Artamella viridis (E-Madagascar)
 Pollen's vanga, Xenopirostris polleni (E-Madagascar)
 Lafresnaye's vanga, Xenopirostris xenopirostris (E-Madagascar)
 Van Dam's vanga, Xenopirostris damii (E-Madagascar)

Bushshrikes and allies
Order: PasseriformesFamily: Malaconotidae

Bushshrikes are similar in habits to shrikes, hunting insects and other small prey from a perch on a bush. Although similar in build to the shrikes, these tend to be either colourful species or largely black; some species are quite secretive. All of the listed species except black-crowned tchagra are endemic to Africa.

 Brubru, Nilaus afer Northern puffback, Dryoscopus gambensis Pringle's puffback, Dryoscopus pringlii Black-backed puffback, Dryoscopus cubla Red-eyed puffback, Dryoscopus senegalensis Pink-footed puffback, Dryoscopus angolensis Sabine's puffback, Dryoscopus sabini Marsh tchagra, Tchagra minutus Black-crowned tchagra, Tchagra senegalus Brown-crowned tchagra, Tchagra australis Three-streaked tchagra, Tchagra jamesi Southern tchagra, Tchagra tchagra Red-naped bushshrike, Laniarius ruficeps Coastal boubou, Laniarius nigerrimus Lühder's bushshrike, Laniarius luehderi Braun's bushshrike, Laniarius brauni (E-Angola)
 Gabela bushshrike, Laniarius amboimensis (E-Angola)
 Turati's boubou, Laniarius turatii Ethiopian boubou, Laniarius aethiopicus (see note below) 
 Tropical boubou, Laniarius major Zanzibar boubou, Laniarius sublacteus Gabon boubou, Laniarius bicolor Southern boubou, Laniarius ferrugineus Yellow-crowned gonolek, Laniarius barbarus Black-headed gonolek, Laniarius erythrogaster Crimson-breasted gonolek, Laniarius atrococcineus Papyrus gonolek, Laniarius mufumbiri Yellow-breasted boubou, Laniarius atroflavus Slate-colored boubou, Laniarius funebris Lowland sooty boubou, Laniarius leucorhynchus Willard's sooty boubou, Laniarius willardi Western boubou, Laniarius poensis Albertine boubou, Laniarius holomelas 
 Fülleborn's boubou, Laniarius fuelleborni Rosy-patched bushshrike, Rhodophoneus cruentus Bokmakierie, Telophorus zeylonus Gray-green bushshrike, Telophorus bocagei Sulphur-breasted bushshrike, Telophorus sulfureopectus Olive bushshrike, Telophorus olivaceus Many-colored bushshrike, Telophorus multicolor Black-fronted bushshrike, Telophorus nigrifrons Mount Kupe bushshrike, Telophorus kupeensis (E-Cameroon)
 Four-colored bushshrike, Telophorus viridis Doherty's bushshrike, Telophorus dohertyi Fiery-breasted bushshrike, Malaconotus cruentus Lagden's bushshrike, Malaconotus lagdeni Green-breasted bushshrike, Malaconotus gladiator Gray-headed bushshrike, Malaconotus blanchoti Monteiro's bushshrike, Malaconotus monteiri Uluguru bushshrike, Malaconotus alius (E-Tanzania)

Drongos
Order: PasseriformesFamily: Dicruridae

The drongos are mostly black or dark grey in colour, sometimes with metallic tints. They have long forked tails, and some Asian species have elaborate tail decorations. They have short legs and sit very upright when perched, like a shrike. They flycatch or take prey from the ground. All of the listed species are endemic to Africa.

 Western square-tailed drongo, Dicrurus occidentalis Sharpe's drongo, Dicrurus sharpei Common square-tailed drongo, Dicrurus ludwigii Shining drongo, Dicrurus atripennis Fork-tailed drongo, Dicrurus adsimilis Glossy-backed drongo, Dicrurus divaricatus Fanti drongo, Dicrurus atactus Velvet-mantled drongo, Dicrurus modestus Aldabra drongo, Dicrurus aldabranus (E-Aldabra)
 Comoro drongo, Dicrurus fuscipennis (E-Comoros)
 Crested drongo, Dicrurus forficatus (E)
 Mayotte drongo, Dicrurus waldenii (E-Mayotte)
 Hair-crested drongo, Dicrurus hottentottus (V)

Monarch flycatchers
Order: PasseriformesFamily: Monarchidae

The monarch flycatchers are small to medium-sized insectivorous passerines which hunt by flycatching.

 Blue-headed crested-flycatcher, Trochocercus nitens (E)
 African crested-flycatcher, Trochocercus cyanomelas (E)
 Mascarene paradise-flycatcher, Terpsiphone bourbonnensis (E-Mascarene islands)
 Sao Tome paradise-flycatcher, Terpsiphone atrochalybeia (E-São Tomé and Príncipe)
 Seychelles paradise-flycatcher, Terpsiphone corvina (E-Seychelles)
 Malagasy paradise-flycatcher, Terpsiphone mutata (E)
 Black-headed paradise-flycatcher, Terpsiphone rufiventer (E)
 Bedford's paradise-flycatcher, Terpsiphone bedfordi (E-Democratic Republic of the Congo)
 Rufous-vented paradise-flycatcher, Terpsiphone rufocinerea (E)
 Bates's paradise-flycatcher, Terpsiphone batesi (E)
 African paradise-flycatcher, Terpsiphone viridisShrikes
Order: PasseriformesFamily: Laniidae

Shrikes are passerine birds known for their habit of catching other birds and small animals and impaling the uneaten portions of their bodies on thorns. A shrike's beak is hooked, like that of a typical bird of prey.

 Red-backed shrike, Lanius collurio Red-tailed shrike, Lanius phoenicuroides Isabelline shrike, Lanius isabellinus Brown shrike, Lanius cristatus (V) 
 Emin's shrike, Lanius gubernator (E)
 Iberian gray shrike, Lanius meridionalis (V)
 Great gray shrike, Lanius excubitor Lesser gray shrike, Lanius minor Gray-backed fiscal, Lanius excubitoroides (E)
 Long-tailed fiscal, Lanius cabanisi (E)
 Yellow-billed shrike, Lanius corvinus (E)
 Magpie shrike, Lanius melanoleucus (E)
 Taita fiscal, Lanius dorsalis (E)
 Somali fiscal, Lanius somalicus (E)
 Mackinnon's shrike, Lanius mackinnoni (E)
 Northern fiscal, Lanius humeralis (E)
 Southern fiscal, Lanius collaris (E)
 Souza's shrike, Lanius souzae (E)
 Newton's fiscal, Lanius newtoni (E)
 Masked shrike, Lanius nubicus Woodchat shrike, Lanius senator White-rumped shrike, Eurocephalus ruppelli (E)
 White-crowned shrike, Eurocephalus anguitimens (E)

Crows, jays, and magpies
Order: PasseriformesFamily: Corvidae

The family Corvidae includes crows, ravens, jays, choughs, magpies, treepies, nutcrackers and ground jays. Corvids are above average in size among the Passeriformes, and some of the larger species show high levels of intelligence.

 Eurasian jay, Garrulus glandarius Maghreb magpie, Pica mauritanica (E)
 Eurasian magpie, Pica pica Stresemann's bush-crow, Zavattariornis stresemanni (E-Ethiopia)
 Eurasian nutcracker, Nucifraga caryocatactes (V)
 Red-billed chough, Pyrrhocorax pyrrhocorax Yellow-billed chough, Pyrrhocorax graculus Piapiac, Ptilostomus afer (E)
 Eurasian jackdaw, Corvus monedula House crow, Corvus splendens Cape crow, Corvus capensis (E)
 Rook, Corvus frugilegus Carrion crow, Corvus corone (V)
 Hooded crow, Corvus cornix Pied crow, Corvus albus Brown-necked raven, Corvus ruficollis Somali crow, Corvus edithae (E)
 Fan-tailed raven, Corvus rhipidurus White-necked raven, Corvus albicollis (E)
 Thick-billed raven, Corvus crassirostris (E)
 Common raven, Corvus coraxRockfowl
Order: PasseriformesFamily: Picathartidae

Rockfowl are lanky birds with crow-like bills, long necks, tails and legs, and strong feet adapted to terrestrial feeding. They are similar in size and structure to the completely unrelated roadrunners, but they hop rather than walk. They also have brightly colored unfeathered heads. The entire family is endemic to Africa.

 White-necked rockfowl, Picathartes gymnocephalus Gray-necked rockfowl, Picathartes oreasRockjumpers
Order: PasseriformesFamily: Chaetopidae

These two species are the only ones in their family. They are primarily insectivores, but cape rockjumpers also eat small vertebrates. The entire family is endemic to Africa.

 Cape rockjumper, Chaetops frenatus (E-South Africa)
 Drakensberg rockjumper, Chaetops aurantiusHyliotas
Order: PasseriformesFamily: Hyliotidae

The members of this small family, all of genus Hyliota, are birds of the forest canopy. They tend to feed in mixed-species flocks. The entire family is endemic to Africa.

 Yellow-bellied hyliota, Hyliota flavigaster Southern hyliota, Hyliota australis Usambara hyliota, Hyliota usambarae (E-Tanzania)
 Violet-backed hyliota, Hyliota violaceaFairy flycatchers
Order: PasseriformesFamily: Stenostiridae

Most of the species of this small family are found in Africa, though a few inhabit tropical Asia. They are not closely related to other birds called "flycatchers". All of the listed species are endemic to Africa.

 Fairy flycatcher, Stenostira scita African blue flycatcher, Elminia longicauda White-tailed blue flycatcher, Elminia albicauda Dusky crested-flycatcher, Elminia nigromitrata White-bellied crested-flycatcher, Elminia albiventris White-tailed crested-flycatcher, Elminia albonotataTits, chickadees, and titmice 
Order: PasseriformesFamily: Paridae

The Paridae are mainly small stocky woodland species with short stout bills. Some have crests. They are adaptable birds, with a mixed diet including seeds and insects.

 Coal tit, Periparus ater Crested tit, Lophophanes cristatus (V)
 African blue tit, Cyanistes teneriffae Great tit, Parus major White-shouldered black-tit, Melaniparus guineensis (E)
 White-winged black-tit, Melaniparus leucomelas (E)
 Rufous-bellied tit, Melaniparus rufiventris (E)
 White-bellied tit, Melaniparus albiventris (E)
 Southern black-tit, Melaniparus niger (E)
 Carp's tit, Melaniparus carpi (E)
 Dusky tit, Melaniparus funereus (E)
 Miombo tit, Melaniparus griseiventris (E)
 Stripe-breasted tit, Melaniparus fasciiventer (E)
 Somali tit, Melaniparus thruppi (E)
 Red-throated tit, Melaniparus fringillinus (E)
 White-backed black-tit, Melaniparus leuconotus (E)
 Ashy tit, Melaniparus cinerascens (E)
 Gray tit, Melaniparus afer (E)

Penduline-tits
Order: PasseriformesFamily: Remizidae

The penduline-tits are a group of small passerine birds related to the true tits. They are insectivores.

 Eurasian penduline-tit, Remiz pendulinus (V)
 Sennar penduline-tit, Anthoscopus punctifrons (E)
 Mouse-colored penduline-tit, Anthoscopus musculus (E)
 Yellow penduline-tit, Anthoscopus parvulus (E)
 Forest penduline-tit, Anthoscopus flavifrons (E)
 African penduline-tit, Anthoscopus caroli (E)
 Southern penduline-tit, Anthoscopus minutus (E)

Larks
Order: PasseriformesFamily: Alaudidae

Larks are small terrestrial birds with often extravagant songs and display flights. Most larks are fairly dull in appearance. Their food is insects and seeds.

 Greater hoopoe lark, Alaemon alaudipes Lesser hoopoe lark, Alaemon hamertoni (E-Somalia)
 Spike-heeled lark, Chersomanes albofasciata (E)
 Gray's lark, Ammomanopsis grayi (E)
 Short-clawed lark, Certhilauda chuana (E)
 Karoo long-billed lark, Certhilauda subcoronata (E)
 Eastern long-billed lark, Certhilauda semitorquata (E-South Africa)
 Cape lark, Certhilauda curvirostris (E)
 Rufous-rumped lark, Pinarocorys erythropygia (E)
 Dusky lark, Pinarocorys nigricans (E)
 Thick-billed lark, Ramphocoris clotbey Bar-tailed lark, Ammomanes cinctura Desert lark, Ammomanes deserti Black-eared sparrow-lark, Eremopterix australis (E)
 Madagascar lark, Eremopterix hova (E-Madagascar)
 Chestnut-backed sparrow-lark, Eremopterix leucotis (E)
 Black-crowned sparrow-lark, Eremopterix nigriceps Chestnut-headed sparrow-lark, Eremopterix signatus Gray-backed sparrow-lark, Eremopterix verticalis (E)
 Fischer's sparrow-lark, Eremopterix leucopareia (E)
 Sabota lark, Calendulauda sabota (E)
 Pink-breasted lark, Calendulauda poecilosterna (E)
 Fawn-colored lark, Calendulauda africanoides (E)
 Karoo lark, Calendulauda albescens (E)
 Red lark, Calendulauda burra (E-South Africa)
 Barlow's lark, Calendulauda barlowi (E)
 Dune lark, Calendulauda erythrochlamys (E-Namibia)
 Liben lark, Heteromirafra archeri (E)
 Rudd's lark, Heteromirafra ruddi (E-South Africa)
 Cape clapper lark, Mirafra apiata (E)
 Eastern clapper lark, Mirafra fasciolata (E)
 Collared lark, Mirafra collaris (E)
 Red-winged lark, Mirafra hypermetra (E)
 Rufous-naped lark, Mirafra africana (E)
 Ash's lark, Mirafra ashi (E-Somalia)
 Somali long-billed lark, Mirafra somalica (E-Somalia)
 Angola lark, Mirafra angolensis (E)
 Flappet lark, Mirafra rufocinnamomea (E)
 Kordofan lark, Mirafra cordofanica (E)
 Williams's lark, Mirafra williamsi (E-Kenya)
 Friedmann's lark, Mirafra pulpa (E)
 Monotonous lark, Mirafra passerina (E)
 White-tailed lark, Mirafra albicauda (E)
 Latakoo lark, Mirafra cheniana (E)
 Horsfield’s bushlark, Mirafra javanica Rusty lark, Mirafra rufa (E)
 Gillett's lark, Mirafra gilletti (E)
 Horned lark, Eremophila alpestris Temminck's lark, Eremophila bilopha Blanford's lark, Calandrella blanfordi Rufous-capped lark, Calandrella eremica Red-capped lark, Calandrella cinerea Greater short-toed lark, Calandrella brachydactyla Bimaculated lark, Melanocorypha bimaculata Calandra lark, Melanocorypha calandra Dupont's lark, Chersophilus duponti Dunn's lark, Eremalauda dunni Somali short-toed lark, Alaudala somalica (E)
 Mediterranean short-toed lark, Alaudala rufescens Turkestan short-toed lark, Alaudala heinei Wood lark, Lullula arborea Stark's lark, Spizocorys starki (E)
 Sclater's lark, Spizocorys sclateri (E)
 Short-tailed lark, Spizocorys fremantlii (E)
 Pink-billed lark, Spizocorys conirostris (E)
 Botha's lark, Spizocorys fringillaris (E-South Africa)
 Obbia lark, Spizocorys obbiensis (E-Somalia)
 Masked lark, Spizocorys personata (E)
 Eurasian skylark, Alauda arvensis Oriental skylark, Alauda gulgula Razo skylark, Alauda razae (E-Cape Verde)
 Sun lark, Galerida modesta (E)
 Large-billed lark, Galerida magnirostris (E)
 Thekla's lark, Galerida theklae Crested lark, Galerida cristataBearded reedling
Order: PasseriformesFamily: Panuridae

A single species formerly placed in the Old World babbler family.

 Bearded reedling, Panurus biarmicus (V)

Nicators
Order: PasseriformesFamily: Nicatoridae

The nicators are shrike-like, with hooked bills. They are endemic to sub-Saharan Africa.

 Western nicator, Nicator chloris Eastern nicator, Nicator gularis Yellow-throated nicator, Nicator vireoAfrican warblers
Order: PasseriformesFamily: Macrosphenidae

African warblers are small to medium-sized insectivores which are found in a wide variety of habitats south of the Sahara.

 Green crombec, Sylvietta virens (E)
 Lemon-bellied crombec, Sylvietta denti (E)
 White-browed crombec, Sylvietta leucophrys (E)
 Northern crombec, Sylvietta brachyura (E)
 Short-billed crombec, Sylvietta philippae (E)
 Red-capped crombec, Sylvietta ruficapilla (E)
 Red-faced crombec, Sylvietta whytii (E)
 Somali crombec, Sylvietta isabellina (E)
 Cape crombec, Sylvietta rufescens (E)
 Rockrunner, Achaetops pycnopygius (E)
 Moustached grass-warbler, Melocichla mentalis Cape grassbird, Sphenoeacus afer (E)
 Victorin's warbler, Cryptillas victorini (E-South Africa)
 Kemp's longbill, Macrosphenus kempi (E)
 Yellow longbill, Macrosphenus flavicans (E)
 Gray longbill, Macrosphenus concolor (E)
 Pulitzer's longbill, Macrosphenus pulitzeri (E-Angola)
 Kretschmer's longbill, Macrosphenus kretschmeri (E)
 Grauer's warbler, Graueria vittata (E)
 Green hylia, Hylia prasina (E)
 Tit-hylia, Pholidornis rushiae (E)

Cisticolas and allies
Order: PasseriformesFamily: Cisticolidae

The Cisticolidae are warblers found mainly in warmer southern regions of the Old World. They are generally very small birds of drab brown or grey appearance found in open country such as grassland or scrub.

 Common jery, Neomixis tenella (E-Madagascar)
 Green jery, Neomixis viridis (E-Madagascar)
 Stripe-throated jery, Neomixis striatigula (E-Madagascar)
 Salvadori's eremomela, Eremomela salvadorii (E)
 Yellow-vented eremomela, Eremomela flavicrissalis (E)
 Yellow-bellied eremomela, Eremomela icteropygialis (E)
 Senegal eremomela, Eremomela pusilla (E)
 Green-backed eremomela, Eremomela canescens (E)
 Greencap eremomela, Eremomela scotops (E)
 Yellow-rumped eremomela, Eremomela gregalis (E)
 Rufous-crowned eremomela, Eremomela badiceps (E)
 Turner's eremomela, Eremomela turneri (E)
 Black-necked eremomela, Eremomela atricollis (E)
 Burnt-neck eremomela, Eremomela usticollis (E)
 Red-winged gray warbler, Drymocichla incana (E)
 Sierra Leone prinia, Schistolais leontica (E)
 White-chinned prinia, Schistolais leucopogon (E)
 Roberts's warbler, Oreophilais robertsi (E)
 Namaqua warbler, Phragmacia substriata (E)
 Green longtail, Urolais epichlorus (E)
 Black-collared apalis, Oreolais pulchrer (E)
 Rwenzori apalis, Oreolais ruwenzorii (E)
 African tailorbird, Artisornis metopias (E)
 Long-billed tailorbird, Artisornis moreaui (E)
 Mozambique forest warbler, Artisornis sousae (E)
 White-tailed warbler, Poliolais lopezi (E)
 Miombo wren-warbler, Calamonastes undosus (E)
 Stierling's wren-warbler, Calamonastes stierlingi (E)
 Gray wren-warbler, Calamonastes simplex (E)
 Barred wren-warbler, Calamonastes fasciolatus (E)
 Green-backed camaroptera, Camaroptera brachyura (E)
 Hartert's camaroptera, Camaroptera harterti (E)
 Yellow-browed camaroptera, Camaroptera superciliaris (E)
 Olive-green camaroptera, Camaroptera chloronota (E)
 Cricket longtail, Spiloptila clamans (E)
 Buff-bellied warbler, Phyllolais pulchella (E)
 Bar-throated apalis, Apalis thoracica (E)
 Taita apalis, Apalis fuscigularis (E-Kenya)
 Yellow-throated apalis, Apalis flavigularis (E)
 Namuli apalis, Apalis lynesi (E-Mozambique)
 Black-capped apalis, Apalis nigriceps (E)
 Black-throated apalis, Apalis jacksoni (E)
 White-winged apalis, Apalis chariessa (E)
 Masked apalis, Apalis binotata (E)
 Black-faced apalis, Apalis personata (E)
 Yellow-breasted apalis, Apalis flavida (E)
 Rudd's apalis, Apalis ruddi (E)
 Sharpe's apalis, Apalis sharpii (E)
 Buff-throated apalis, Apalis rufogularis (E)
 Kungwe apalis, Apalis argentea (E)
 Bamenda apalis, Apalis bamendae (E-Cameroon)
 Gosling's apalis, Apalis goslingi (E)
 Kabobo apalis, Apalis kaboboensis (E-Democratic Republic of the Congo)
 Chestnut-throated apalis, Apalis porphyrolaema (E)
 Chapin's apalis, Apalis chapini (E)
 Black-headed apalis, Apalis melanocephala (E)
 Chirinda apalis, Apalis chirindensis (E)
 Gray apalis, Apalis cinerea (E)
 Brown-headed apalis, Apalis alticola (E)
 Karamoja apalis, Apalis karamojae (E)
 Graceful prinia, Prinia gracilis Tawny-flanked prinia, Prinia subflava (E)
 Pale prinia, Prinia somalica (E)
 River prinia, Prinia fluviatilis (E)
 Black-chested prinia, Prinia flavicans (E)
 Karoo prinia, Prinia maculosa (E)
 Drakensberg prinia, Prinia hypoxantha (E)
 Sao Tome prinia, Prinia molleri (E-São Tomé and Príncipe)
 Banded prinia, Prinia bairdii (E)
 Red-winged prinia, Prinia erythroptera (E)
 Red-fronted prinia, Prinia rufifrons (E)
 Kopje warbler, Euryptila subcinnamomea (E)
 Mrs. Moreau's warbler, Scepomycter winifredae (E-Tanzania)
 Socotra warbler, Incana incana (E)
 Rufous-eared warbler, Malcorus pectoralis (E)
 Black-capped rufous-warbler, Bathmocercus cerviniventris (E)
 Black-faced rufous-warbler, Bathmocercus rufus (E)
 Oriole warbler, Hypergerus atriceps (E)
 Gray-capped warbler, Eminia lepida (E)
 Red-faced cisticola, Cisticola erythrops (E)
 Singing cisticola, Cisticola cantans (E)
 Whistling cisticola, Cisticola lateralis (E)
 Chattering cisticola, Cisticola anonymus (E)
 Trilling cisticola, Cisticola woosnami (E)
 Bubbling cisticola, Cisticola bulliens (E)
 Chubb's cisticola, Cisticola chubbi (E)
 Hunter's cisticola, Cisticola hunteri (E)
 Black-lored cisticola, Cisticola nigriloris (E)
 Kilombero cisticola, Cisticola bakerorum (E-Tanzania)
 Rock-loving cisticola, Cisticola aberrans (E)
 Boran cisticola, Cisticola bodessa (E)
 Rattling cisticola, Cisticola chiniana (E)
 Ashy cisticola, Cisticola cinereolus (E)
 Red-pate cisticola, Cisticola ruficeps (E)
 Dorst's cisticola, Cisticola guinea (E)
 Tinkling cisticola, Cisticola rufilatus (E)
 Red-headed cisticola, Cisticola subruficapilla (E)
 Wailing cisticola, Cisticola lais (E)
 Tana River cisticola, Cisticola restrictus (E-Kenya)
 Churring cisticola, Cisticola njombe (E)
 Coastal cisticola, Cisticola haematocephalus (E)
 White-tailed cisticola, Cisticola anderseni (E-Tanzania)
 Luapula cisticola, Cisticola luapula (E)
 Chirping cisticola, Cisticola pipiens (E)
 Ethiopian cisticola, Cisticola lugubris (E-Ethiopia)
 Winding cisticola, Cisticola galactotes (E)
 Rufous-winged cisticola, Cisticola galactotes (E)
 Carruthers's cisticola, Cisticola carruthersi (E)
 Levaillant's cisticola, Cisticola tinniens (E)
 Stout cisticola, Cisticola robustus (E)
 Croaking cisticola, Cisticola natalensis (E)
 Piping cisticola, Cisticola fulvicapilla (E)
 Aberdare cisticola, Cisticola aberdare (E-Kenya)
 Tabora cisticola, Cisticola angusticauda (E)
 Slender-tailed cisticola, Cisticola melanurus (E)
 Siffling cisticola, Cisticola brachypterus (E)
 Rufous cisticola, Cisticola rufus (E)
 Foxy cisticola, Cisticola troglodytes (E)
 Tiny cisticola, Cisticola nanus (E)
 Zitting cisticola, Cisticola juncidis Socotra cisticola, Cisticola haesitatus (E)
 Madagascar cisticola, Cisticola cherina (E)
 Desert cisticola, Cisticola aridulus (E)
 Cloud cisticola, Cisticola textrix (E)
 Black-backed cisticola, Cisticola eximius (E)
 Cloud-scraping cisticola, Cisticola dambo (E)
 Pectoral-patch cisticola, Cisticola brunnescens (E)
 Pale-crowned cisticola, Cisticola cinnamomeus (E)
 Wing-snapping cisticola, Cisticola ayresii (E)

Reed warblers and allies
Order: PasseriformesFamily: Acrocephalidae

The members of this family are usually rather large for "warblers". Most are rather plain olivaceous brown above with much yellow to beige below. They are usually found in open woodland, reedbeds, or tall grass. The family occurs mostly in southern to western Eurasia and surroundings, but it also ranges far into the Pacific, with some species in  Africa.

 Aldabra brush-warbler, Nesillas aldabrana (E-Aldabra) extinct
 Malagasy brush-warbler, Nesillas typica (E)
 Subdesert brush-warbler, Nesillas lantzii (E-Madagascar)
 Grand Comoro brush-warbler, Nesillas brevicaudata (E)
 Moheli brush-warbler, Nesillas mariae (E-Comoros)
 Papyrus yellow warbler, Calamonastides gracilirostris (E)
 Thick-billed warbler, Arundinax aedon (V)
 Booted warbler, Iduna caligata Sykes's warbler, Iduna rama (V)
 Eastern olivaceous warbler, Iduna pallida Western olivaceous warbler, Iduna opaca African yellow-warbler, Iduna natalensis (E)
 Mountain yellow-warbler, Iduna similis (E)
 Upcher's warbler, Hippolais languida Olive-tree warbler, Hippolais olivetorum Melodious warbler, Hippolais polyglotta Icterine warbler, Hippolais icterina Aquatic warbler, Acrocephalus paludicola Moustached warbler, Acrocephalus melanopogon Sedge warbler, Acrocephalus schoenobaenus Blyth's reed warbler, Acrocephalus dumetorum (V)
 Marsh warbler, Acrocephalus palustris Common reed warbler, Acrocephalus scirpaceus'
 Basra reed warbler, Acrocephalus griseldis
 Lesser swamp warbler, Acrocephalus gracilirostris (E)
 Greater swamp warbler, Acrocephalus rufescens (E)
 Cape Verde swamp warbler, Acrocephalus brevipennis (E-Cape Verde)
 Madagascar swamp warbler, Acrocephalus newtoni (E-Madagascar)
 Rodrigues warbler, Acrocephalus rodericanus (E-Rodrigues)
 Seychelles warbler, Acrocephalus sechellensis (E-Seychelles)
 Great reed warbler, Acrocephalus arundinaceus 
 Clamorous reed warbler, Acrocephalus stentoreus

Grassbirds and allies Order: PasseriformesFamily: Locustellidae

Locustellidae are a family of small insectivorous songbirds found mainly in Eurasia, Africa, and the Australian region. They are smallish birds with tails that are usually long and pointed, and tend to be drab brownish or buffy all over.

 Pallas's grasshopper warbler, Locustella certhiola (V)
 Bamboo warbler, Bradypterus alfredi (E)
 River warbler, Locustella fluviatilis
 Savi's warbler, Locustella luscinioides
 Common grasshopper warbler, Locustella naevia
 Fan-tailed grassbird, Schoenicola brevirostris (E)
 Knysna warbler, Bradypterus sylvaticus (E)
 Bangwa warbler, Bradypterus bangwaensis (E)
 Barratt's warbler, Bradypterus barratti (E)
 Evergreen-forest warbler, Bradypterus lopezi (E)
 Cinnamon bracken-warbler, Bradypterus cinnamomeus (E)
 Dja River swamp warbler, Bradypterus grandis (E)
 Little rush warbler, Bradypterus baboecala (E)
 White-winged swamp warbler, Bradypterus carpalis (E)
 Grauer's swamp warbler, Bradypterus graueri (E)
 Highland rush warbler, Bradypterus centralis (E)

Malagasy warblersOrder: PasseriformesFamily: Bernieridae

The Malagasy warblers are a newly validated family of songbirds. They were formally named Bernieridae in 2010.  The family currently consists of eleven species (in eight genera) of small forest birds. These birds are all endemic to Madagascar.

 White-throated oxylabes, Oxylabes madagascariensis
 Long-billed bernieria, Bernieria madagascariensis
 Cryptic warbler, Cryptosylvicola randriansoloi
 Wedge-tailed jery, Hartertula flavoviridis
 Thamnornis,Thamnornis chloropetoides
 Yellow-browed oxylabes, Crossleyia xanthophrys
 Spectacled tetraka, Xanthomixis zosterops
 Appert's tetraka, Xanthomixis apperti
 Dusky tetraka, Xanthomixis tenebrosus
 Gray-crowned tetraka, Xanthomixis cinereiceps
 Rand's warbler, Randia pseudozosterops

SwallowsOrder: PasseriformesFamily: Hirundinidae

The family Hirundinidae is adapted to aerial feeding. They have a slender streamlined body, long pointed wings and a short bill with a wide gape. The feet are adapted to perching rather than walking, and the front toes are partially joined at the base.

 African river martin, Pseudochelidon eurystomina (E)
 Plain martin, Riparia paludicola
 Congo martin, Riparia congica (E)
 Bank swallow, Riparia riparia
 Pale sand martin, Riparia diluta (V)
 Banded martin, Riparia cincta
 Mascarene martin, Phedina borbonica
 Brazza's martin, Phedinopsis brazzae (E)
 Eurasian crag-martin, Ptyonoprogne rupestris
 Rock martin, Ptyonoprogne fuligula
 Barn swallow, Hirundo rustica
 Red-chested swallow, Hirundo lucida (E)
 Ethiopian swallow, Hirundo aethiopica
 Angola swallow, Hirundo angolensis (E)
 White-throated blue swallow, Hirundo nigrita (E)
 White-throated swallow, Hirundo albigularis (E)
 Wire-tailed swallow, Hirundo smithii
 Pied-winged swallow, Hirundo leucosoma (E)
 White-tailed swallow, Hirundo megaensis (E-Ethiopia)
 Pearl-breasted swallow, Hirundo dimidiata (E)
 Montane blue swallow, Hirundo atrocaerulea (E)
 Black-and-rufous swallow, Hirundo nigrorufa (E)
 Greater striped swallow, Cecropis cucullata (E)
 Red-rumped swallow, Cecropis daurica
 Lesser striped swallow, Cecropis abyssinica
 Rufous-chested swallow, Cecropis semirufa (E)
 Mosque swallow, Cecropis senegalensis (E)
 Red-throated swallow, Petrochelidon rufigula (E)
 Preuss's swallow, Hirundo preussi (E)
 Red Sea swallow, Petrochelidon perdita (E-Sudan)
 South African swallow, Petrochelidon spilodera (E)
 Streak-throated swallow, Petrochelidon fluvicola (V)
 Forest swallow, Atronanus fuliginosus (E)
 Common house martin, Delichon urbicum
 Square-tailed sawwing, Psalidoprocne nitens (E)
 Mountain sawwing, Psalidoprocne fuliginosa (E)
 White-headed sawwing, Psalidoprocne albiceps (E)
 Black sawwing, Psalidoprocne pristoptera (E)
 Fanti sawwing, Psalidoprocne obscura (E)
 Gray-rumped swallow, Pseudhirundo griseopyga (E)

BulbulsOrder: PasseriformesFamily: Pycnonotidae

Bulbuls are medium-sized songbirds. Some are colourful with yellow, red or orange vents, cheeks, throats or supercilia, but most are drab, with uniform olive-brown to black plumage. Some species have distinct crests.

 Sombre greenbul, Andropadus importunus (E)
 Slender-billed greenbul, Stelgidillas gracilirostris (E)
 Golden greenbul, Calyptocichla serinus (E)
 Black-collared bulbul, Neolestes torquatus (E)
 Red-tailed bristlebill, Bleda syndactylus (E)
 Green-tailed bristlebill, Bleda eximius (E)
 Lesser bristlebill, Bleda notatus (E)
 Gray-headed bristlebill, Bleda canicapillus (E)
 Cameroon mountain greenbul, Arizelocichla montana (E)
 Shelley's greenbul, Arizelocichla masukuensis (E)
 Western mountain greenbul, Arizelocichla tephrolaemus (E)
 Eastern mountain greenbul, Arizelocichla nigriceps (E)
 Uluguru mountain greenbul, Arizelocichla neumanni (E-Tanzania)
 Yellow-throated mountain greenbul, Arizelocichla chlorigula (E-Tanzania)
 Black-browed mountain greenbul, Arizelocichla fusciceps (E)
 Stripe-cheeked bulbul, Arizelocichla milanjensis (E)
 Simple greenbul, Chlorocichla simplex (E)
 Yellow-necked greenbul, Chlorocichla falkensteini (E)
 Yellow-bellied greenbul, Chlorocichla flaviventris (E)
 Joyful greenbul, Chlorocichla laetissima (E)
 Prigogine's greenbul, Chlorocichla prigoginei (E-Democratic Republic of the Congo)
 Honeyguide greenbul, Baeopogon indicator (E)
 Sjöstedt's greenbul, Baeopogon clamans (E)
 Yellow-throated greenbul, Atimastillas flavicollis (E)
 Spotted greenbul, Ixonotus guttatus (E)
 Swamp greenbul, Thescelocichla leucopleura (E)
 Red-tailed greenbul, Criniger calurus (E)
 Western bearded-greenbul, Criniger barbatus (E)
 Eastern bearded-greenbul, Criniger chloronotus (E)
 Yellow-bearded greenbul, Criniger olivaceus (E)
 White-bearded greenbul, Criniger ndussumensis (E)
 Gray greenbul, Eurillas gracilis (E)
 Ansorge's greenbul, Eurillas ansorgei (E)
 Plain greenbul, Eurillas curvirostris (E)
 Yellow-whiskered greenbul, Eurillas latirostris (E)
 Little greenbul, Eurillas virens (E)
 Leaf-love, Phyllastrephus scandens (E)
 Terrestrial brownbul, Phyllastrephus terrestris (E)
 Northern brownbul, Phyllastrephus strepitans (E)
 Pale-olive greenbul, Phyllastrephus fulviventris (E)
 Gray-olive greenbul, Phyllastrephus cerviniventris (E)
 Baumann's greenbul, Phyllastrephus baumanni (E)
 Toro olive greenbul, Phyllastrephus hypochloris (E)
 Fischer's greenbul, Phyllastrephus fischeri (E)
 Cabanis's greenbul, Phyllastrephus cabanisi (E)
 Cameroon olive-greenbul, Phyllastrephus poensis (E)
 Icterine greenbul, Phyllastrephus icterinus (E)
 Sassi's greenbul, Phyllastrephus lorenzi (E)
 Xavier's greenbul, Phyllastrephus xavieri (E)
 White-throated greenbul, Phyllastrephus albigularis (E)
 Yellow-streaked bulbul, Phyllastrephus flavostriatus (E)
 Gray-headed greenbul, Phyllastrephus poliocephalus (E)
 Tiny greenbul, Phyllastrephus debilis (E)
 Usambara greenbul, Phyllastrephus albigula (E-Tanzania)
 Common bulbul, Pycnonotus barbatus
 Black-fronted bulbul, Pycnonotus nigricans (E)
 Cape bulbul, Pycnonotus capensis (E-South Africa)
 White-spectacled bulbul, Pycnonotus xanthopygos
 Malagasy bulbul, Hypsipetes madagascariensis (E)
 Seychelles bulbul, Hypsipetes crassirostris (E-Seychelles)
 Grand Comoro bulbul, Hypsipetes parvirostris (E-Comoro Islands)
 Moheli bulbul, Pycnonotus xanthopygos (E-Comoro Islands)
 Reunion bulbul, Hypsipetes borbonicus (E-Réunion)
 Mauritius bulbul, Hypsipetes olivaceus (E-Mauritius)

Leaf warblersOrder: PasseriformesFamily: Phylloscopidae

Leaf warblers are a family of small insectivorous birds found mostly in Eurasia and ranging into Wallacea and Africa. The species are of various sizes, often green-plumaged above and yellow below, or more subdued with grayish-green to grayish-brown colors.

 Wood warbler, Phylloscopus sibilatrix
 Western Bonelli's warbler, Phylloscopus bonelli
 Eastern Bonelli's warbler, Phylloscopus orientalis
 Yellow-browed warbler, Phylloscopus inornatus (V)
 Hume's warbler, Phylloscopus humei (V)
 Pallas's leaf warbler, Phylloscopus proregulus (V)
 Radde's warbler, Phylloscopus schwarzi (V)
 Dusky warbler, Phylloscopus fuscatus (V)
 Willow warbler, Phylloscopus trochilus
 Mountain chiffchaff, Phylloscopus sindianus (V)
 Canary Islands chiffchaff, Phylloscopus canariensis (E)
 Common chiffchaff, Phylloscopus collybita
 Iberian chiffchaff, Phylloscopus ibericus
 Brown woodland-warbler, Phylloscopus umbrovirens
 Yellow-throated woodland-warbler, Phylloscopus ruficapilla (E)
 Red-faced woodland-warbler, Phylloscopus laetus (E)
 Laura's woodland-warbler, Phylloscopus laurae (E)
 Black-capped woodland-warbler, Phylloscopus herberti (E)
 Uganda woodland-warbler, Phylloscopus budongoensis (E)
 Greenish warbler, Phylloscopus trochiloides 
 Arctic warbler, Phylloscopus borealis (V)

Bush warblers and alliesOrder: PasseriformesFamily: Scotocercidae

The members of this family are found throughout Africa, Asia, and Polynesia. Their taxonomy is in flux, and some authorities place genus Erythrocerus in its own family, the "yellow flycatchers".

 Chestnut-capped flycatcher, Erythrocercus mccallii (E)
 Yellow flycatcher, Erythrocercus holochlorus (E)
 Livingstone's flycatcher, Erythrocercus livingstonei (E)
 Scrub warbler, Scotocerca inquieta
 Neumann's warbler, Urosphena neumanni (E)
 Cetti's warbler, Cettia cetti

Long-tailed titsOrder: PasseriformesFamily: Aegithalidae

The long-tailed tits are a family of small passerine birds with medium to long tails. They make woven bag nests in trees. Most eat a mixed diet which includes insect

 Long-tailed tit, Aegithalos caudatus (V)

Sylviid warblers, parrotbills, and alliesOrder: PasseriformesFamily: Sylviidae

The family Sylviidae is a group of small insectivorous passerine birds. They mainly occur as breeding species, as the common name implies, in Europe, Asia and, to a lesser extent, Africa. Most are of generally undistinguished appearance, but many have distinctive songs.

 Eurasian blackcap, Sylvia atricapilla
 Garden warbler, Sylvia borin
 Dohrn's thrush-babbler, Sylvia dohrni (E-São Tomé and Príncipe)
 Abyssinian catbird, Parophasma galinieri (E-Ethiopia)
 Bush blackcap, Sylvia nigricapillus (E)
 African hill babbler, Pseudoalcippe abyssinica (E)
 Rwenzori hill babbler, Sylvia atriceps (E)
 Barred warbler, Curruca nisoria
 Layard's warbler, Curruca layardi (E)
 Banded parisoma, Curruca boehmi (E)
 Chestnut-vented warbler, Curruca subcoerulea (E)
 Lesser whitethroat, Curruca curruca
 Brown parisoma, Curruca lugens (E)
 Arabian warbler, Curruca leucomelaena
 Western Orphean warbler, Curruca hortensis
 Eastern Orphean warbler, Curruca crassirostris
 African desert warbler, Curruca deserti (E)
 Asian desert warbler, Curruca nana
 Tristram's warbler, Curruca deserticola
 Menetries's warbler, Curruca mystacea
 Rüppell's warbler, Curruca ruppeli
 Cyprus warbler, Curruca melanothorax
 Sardinian warbler, Curruca melanocephala
 Moltoni's warbler, Curruca subalpina (V)   
 Western subalpine warbler, Curruca iveriae
 Eastern subalpine warbler, Curruca cantillans
 Greater whitethroat, Curruca communis
 Spectacled warbler, Curruca conspicillata
 Marmora's warbler, Curruca sarda
 Dartford warbler, Curruca undata
 Balearic warbler, Curruca balearica

White-eyes, yuhinas, and alliesOrder: PasseriformesFamily: Zosteropidae

The white-eyes are small and mostly undistinguished, their plumage above being generally some dull colour like greenish-olive, but some species have a white or bright yellow throat, breast or lower parts, and several have buff flanks. As their name suggests, many species have a white ring around each eye.

 Pale white-eye, Zosterops flavilateralis (E)
 Mbulu white-eye, Zosterops mbuluensis (E)
 Marianne white-eye, Zosterops semiflavus (E-Seychelles) extinct
 Comoro white-eye, Zosterops mouroniensis (E-Comoros)
 Reunion white-eye, Zosterops olivaceus (E-Réunion)
 Mauritius white-eye, Zosterops chloronothos (E-Mauritius)
 Reunion gray white-eye, Zosterops borbonicus (E-Réunion)
 Mauritius gray white-eye, Zosterops mauritianus (E-Mauritius)
 Abyssinian white-eye, Zosterops abyssinicus
 Socotra white-eye, Zosterops socotranus 
 Cameroon speirops, Zosterops melanocephalus (E-Cameroon)
 Forest white-eye, Zosterops stenocricotus (E)
 Green white-eye, Zosterops stuhlmanni (E)
 Kilimanjaro white-eye, Zosterops eurycricotus (E-Tanzania)
 Bioko speirops, Zosterops brunneus (E-Equatorial Guinea)
 Heuglin's white-eye, Zosterops poliogastrus (E)
 Kikuyu white-eye, Zosterops kikuyuensis (E-Kenya)
 Principe white-eye, Zosterops ficedulinus (E-São Tomé and Príncipe)
 Annobon white-eye, Zosterops griseovirescens (E-Equatorial Guinea)
 Sao Tome white-eye, Zosterops feae (E-São Tomé and Príncipe)
 Black-capped speirops, Zosterops lugubris (E-São Tomé and Príncipe)
 Principe speirops, Zosterops leucophoeus (E-São Tomé and Príncipe)
 Taita white-eye, Zosterops silvanus (E-Kenya)
 Northern yellow white-eye, Zosterops senegalensis (E)
 Orange River white-eye, Zosterops pallidus (E)
 South Pare white-eye, Zosterops winifredae (E-Tanzania)
 Cape white-eye, Zosterops virens (E)
 Southern yellow white-eye, Zosterops anderssoni (E)
 Pemba white-eye, Zosterops vaughani (E-Tanzania)
 Seychelles white-eye, Zosterops modestus (E-Seychelles)
 Anjouan white-eye, Zosterops anjuanensis (E-Comoros)
 Moheli white-eye, Zosterops comorensis (E-Comoros)
 Malagasy white-eye, Zosterops maderaspatanus (E)
 Kirk's white-eye, Zosterops kirki (E-Comoros)
 Mayotte white-eye, Zosterops mayottensis (E-Mayotte)
 Aldabra white-eye, Zosterops aldabrensis (E-Aldabra)

Ground babblers and alliesOrder: PasseriformesFamily: Pellorneidae

These small to medium-sized songbirds have soft fluffy plumage but are otherwise rather diverse. Members of the genus Illadopsis are found in forests, but some other genera are birds of scrublands. All of the listed species are endemic to Africa.

 Brown illadopsis, Illadopsis fulvescens
 Pale-breasted illadopsis, Illadopsis rufipennis
 Mountain illadopsis, Illadopsis pyrrhoptera
 Blackcap illadopsis, Illadopsis cleaveri
 Scaly-breasted illadopsis, Illadopsis albipectus
 Thrush babbler, Ptyrticus turdina
 Puvel's illadopsis, Illadopsis puveli
 Rufous-winged illadopsis, Illadopsis rufescens

Laughingthrushes and alliesOrder: PasseriformesFamily: Leiothrichidae

The members of this family are diverse in size and colouration, though those of genus Turdoides tend to be brown or greyish. The family is found in Africa, India, and southeast Asia.

 Red-billed leiothrix, Leiothrix lutea (I)
 Scaly chatterer, Argya aylmeri (E)
 Rufous chatterer, Argya rubiginosa (E)
 Scaly chatterer, Argya aylmeri (E)
 Scaly chatterer, Argya aylmeri (E)
 Fulvous chatterer, Argya fulva (E)
 Arabian babbler, Argya squamiceps
 Capuchin babbler, Turdoides atripennis (E)
 White-throated mountain-babbler, Turdoides gilberti (E)
 Chapin's mountain-babbler, Turdoides chapini (E-Democratic Republic of the Congo)
 Red-collared mountain-babbler, Turdoides rufocinctus (E)
 Brown babbler, Turdoides plebejus (E)
 White-rumped babbler, Turdoides leucopygia (E)
 Hinde's pied-babbler, Turdoides hindei (E-Kenya)
 Scaly babbler, Turdoides squamulata (E)
 Arrow-marked babbler, Turdoides jardineii (E)
 Bare-cheeked babbler, Turdoides gymnogenys (E)
 Cretzschmar's babbler, Turdoides leucocephala (E)
 Blackcap babbler, Turdoides reinwardtii (E)
 Dusky babbler, Turdoides tenebrosa (E)
 Southern pied-babbler, Turdoides bicolor (E)
 Hartlaub's babbler, Turdoides hartlaubii (E)
 Black-lored babbler, Turdoides sharpei (E)
 Black-faced babbler, Turdoides melanops (E)
 Northern pied-babbler, Turdoides hypoleuca (E)

KingletsOrder: PasseriformesFamily: Regulidae

The kinglets are a small family of birds which resemble the titmice. They are very small insectivorous birds in the genus Regulus. The adults have colored crowns, giving rise to their name.

 Goldcrest, Regulus regulus
 Common firecrest, Regulus ignicapilla

WallcreeperOrder: PasseriformesFamily: Tichodromidae

The wallcreeper is a small bird related to the nuthatch family, which has stunning crimson, grey and black plumage.

 Wallcreeper, Tichodroma muraria (V)

NuthatchesOrder: PasseriformesFamily: Sittidae

Nuthatches are small woodland birds. They have the unusual ability to climb down trees head first, unlike other birds which can only go upwards. Nuthatches have big heads, short tails and powerful bills and feet.

 Eurasian nuthatch, Sitta europaea
 Algerian nuthatch, Sitta ledanti (E-Algeria)

TreecreepersOrder: PasseriformesFamily: Certhiidae

Treecreepers are small woodland birds, brown above and white below. They have thin pointed down-curved bills, which they use to extricate insects from bark. They have stiff tail feathers, like woodpeckers, which they use to support themselves on vertical trees.

 Short-toed treecreeper, Certhia brachydactyla
 African spotted creeper, Salpornis salvadori (E)

WrensOrder: PasseriformesFamily: Troglodytidae

The wrens are mainly small and inconspicuous except for their loud songs. These birds have short wings and thin down-turned bills. Several species often hold their tails upright. All are insectivorous.

 Eurasian wren, Troglodytes troglodytes

DippersOrder: PasseriformesFamily: Cinclidae

Dippers are a group of perching birds whose habitat includes aquatic environments in the Americas, Europe and Asia. They are named for their bobbing or dipping movement.

 White-throated dipper, Cinclus cinclus

OxpeckersOrder: PasseriformesFamily: Buphagidae

As both the English and scientific names of these birds imply, they feed on ectoparasites, primarily ticks, found on large mammals. The entire family is endemic to Africa.

 Red-billed oxpecker, Buphagus erythrorynchus
 Yellow-billed oxpecker, Buphagus africanus

StarlingsOrder: PasseriformesFamily: Sturnidae

Starlings are small to medium-sized passerine birds. Their flight is strong and direct and they are very gregarious. Their preferred habitat is fairly open country. They eat insects and fruit. Plumage is typically dark with a metallic sheen.

 Common hill myna, Gracula religiosa (I)
 European starling, Sturnus vulgaris
 Spotless starling, Sturnus unicolor
 Wattled starling, Creatophora cinerea
 Rosy starling, Pastor roseus (V)
 Rodrigues starling, Necropsar rodericanus (E-Rodrigues) extinct
 Reunion starling, Fregilupus varius (E-Réunion) extinct
 Common myna, Acridotheres tristis (I)
 Madagascar starling, Hartlaubius auratus (E-Madagascar)
 Violet-backed starling, Cinnyricinclus leucogaster
 Slender-billed starling, Onychognathus tenuirostris (E)
 Pale-winged starling, Onychognathus nabouroup (E)
 Neumann's starling, Onychognathus neumanni (E)
 Red-winged starling, Onychognathus morio (E)
 Chestnut-winged starling, Onychognathus fulgidus (E)
 Waller's starling, Onychognathus walleri (E)
 Tristram's starling, Onychognathus tristramii
 White-billed starling, Onychognathus albirostris (E)
 Bristle-crowned starling, Onychognathus salvadorii (E)
 Somali starling, Onychognathus blythii (E)
 Babbling starling, Neocichla gutturalis (E)
 White-collared starling, Grafisia torquata (E)
 Magpie starling, Speculipastor bicolor (E)
 Sharpe's starling, Pholiaa sharpii (E)
 Abbott's starling, Poeoptera femoralis (E)
 Narrow-tailed starling, Poeoptera lugubris (E)
 Stuhlmann's starling, Poeoptera stuhlmanni (E)
 Kenrick's starling, Poeoptera kenricki (E)
 Black-bellied starling, Notopholia corusca (E)
 Purple-headed starling, Hylopsar purpureiceps (E)
 Copper-tailed starling, Hylopsar cupreocauda (E)
 Hildebrandt's starling, Lamprotornis hildebrandti (E)
 Shelley's starling, Lamprotornis shelleyi (E)
 Burchell's starling, Lamprotornis australis (E)
 Rüppell's starling, Lamprotornis purpuroptera (E)
 Long-tailed glossy starling, Lamprotornis caudatus (E)
 Meves's starling, Lamprotornis mevesii (E)
 Ashy starling, Lamprotornis unicolor (E)
 Splendid starling, Lamprotornis splendidus (E)
 Principe starling, Lamprotornis ornatus (E-São Tomé and Príncipe)
 Golden-breasted starling, Lamprotornis regius (E)
 Superb starling, Lamprotornis superbus (E)
 Chestnut-bellied starling, Lamprotornis pulcher (E)
 African pied starling, Lamprotornis bicolor (E)
 White-crowned starling, Lamprotornis albicapillus (E)
 Fischer's starling, Lamprotornis fischeri (E)
 Lesser blue-eared starling, Lamprotornis chloropterus (E)
 Sharp-tailed starling, Lamprotornis acuticaudus (E)
 Greater blue-eared starling, Lamprotornis chalybaeus (E)
 Emerald starling, Lamprotornis iris (E)
 Purple starling, Lamprotornis purpureus (E)
 Cape starling, Lamprotornis nitens (E)
 Bronze-tailed starling, Lamprotornis chalcurus (E)

Thrushes and alliesOrder: PasseriformesFamily: Turdidae

The thrushes are a group of passerine birds that occur mainly in the Old World. They are plump, soft plumaged, small to medium-sized insectivores or sometimes omnivores, often feeding on the ground. Many have attractive songs.

 Rufous flycatcher-thrush, Neocossyphus fraseri (E)
 Finsch's flycatcher-thrush, Neocossyphus finschi (E)
 Red-tailed ant-thrush, Neocossyphus rufus (E)
 White-tailed ant-thrush, Neocossyphus poensis (E)
 Spotted ground-thrush, Geokichla guttata (E)
 Black-eared ground-thrush, Geokichla cameronensis (E)
 Gray ground-thrush, Geokichla princei (E)
 Crossley's ground-thrush, Geokichla crossleyi (E)
 Oberländer's ground-thrush, Geokichla oberlaenderi (E)
 Abyssinian ground-thrush, Geokichla piaggiae (E)
 Orange ground-thrush, Geokichla gurneyi
 Groundscraper thrush, Turdus litsitsirupa (E)
 Mistle thrush, Turdus viscivorus
 Song thrush, Turdus philomelos
 Abyssinian thrush, Turdus abyssinicus (E)
 Tristan thrush, Turdus eremitia (E)
 Taita thrush, Turdus helleri (E-Kenya)
 Usambara thrush, Turdus roehli (E-Tanzania)
 Redwing, Turdus iliacus
 Eurasian blackbird, Turdus merula
 Somali thrush, Turdus ludoviciae (E-Somalia)
 African bare-eyed thrush, Turdus tephronotus (E)
 Kurrichane thrush, Turdus libonyana (E)
 Comoro thrush, Turdus bewsheri (E-Comoros)
 African thrush, Turdus pelios (E)
 Olive thrush, Turdus olivaceus (E)
 Karoo thrush, Turdus smithi (E)
 Principe thrush, Turdus xanthorhynchus (E-São Tomé and Príncipe)
 Sao Tome thrush, Turdus olivaceofuscus (E-São Tomé and Príncipe)
 African thrush, Turdus pelios (E)
 Eyebrowed thrush, Turdus obscurus (V)
 Fieldfare, Turdus pilaris
 Ring ouzel, Turdus torquatus
 Black-throated thrush, Turdus atrogularis (V)
 Red-throated thrush, Turdus ruficollis (V)

Old World flycatchersOrder: PasseriformesFamily: Muscicapidae

Old World flycatchers are a large group of small passerine birds native to the Old World. They are mainly small arboreal insectivores. The appearance of these birds is highly varied, but they mostly have weak songs and harsh calls.

 African dusky flycatcher, Muscicapa adusta (E)
 Little flycatcher, Muscicapa epulata (E)
 Yellow-footed flycatcher, Muscicapa sethsmithi (E)
 Spotted flycatcher, Muscicapa striata
 Gambaga flycatcher, Muscicapa gambagae
 Swamp flycatcher, Muscicapa aquatica (E)
 Cassin's flycatcher, Muscicapa cassini (E)
 Böhm's flycatcher, Muscicapa boehmi (E)
 Ussher's flycatcher, Muscicapa ussheri (E)
 Sooty flycatcher, Muscicapa infuscata (E)
 Dusky-blue flycatcher, Muscicapa comitata (E)
 Mariqua flycatcher, Bradornis mariquensis (E)
 African gray flycatcher, Bradornis microrhynchus (E)
 Pale flycatcher, Agricola pallidus (E)
 Chat flycatcher, Agricola infuscatus (E)
 White-browed forest-flycatcher, Fraseria cinerascens (E)
 African forest-flycatcher, Fraseria ocreata (E)
 Gray-throated tit-flycatcher, Fraseria griseigularis (E)
 Gray tit-flycatcher, Fraseria plumbeus (E)
 Olivaceous flycatcher, Fraseria olivascens (E)
 Chapin's flycatcher, Fraseria lendu (E)
 Tessmann's flycatcher, Fraseria tessmanni (E)
 Ashy flycatcher, Fraseria caerulescens (E)
 Herero chat, Melaenornis herero (E)
 Silverbird, Melaenornis semipartitus (E)
 Fiscal flycatcher, Melaenornis silens (E)
 Yellow-eyed black flycatcher, Melaenornis ardesiacus (E)
 Nimba flycatcher, Melaenornis annamarulae (E)
 Northern black-flycatcher, Melaenornis edolioides (E)
 Southern black-flycatcher, Melaenornis pammelaina (E)
 White-eyed slaty-flycatcher, Melaenornis fischeri (E)
 Angola slaty-flycatcher, Melaenornis brunneus (E-Angola)
 Abyssinian slaty-flycatcher, Melaenornis chocolatinus (E)
 Grand Comoro flycatcher, Humblotia flavirostris (E-Comoros)
 White-tailed alethe, Alethe diademata (E)
 Fire-crested alethe, Alethe castanea (E)
 Karoo scrub-robin, Cercotrichas coryphaeus (E)
 Forest scrub-robin, Cercotrichas leucosticta (E)
 Brown scrub-robin, Cercotrichas signata (E)
 Bearded scrub-robin, Cercotrichas quadrivirgata (E)
 Miombo scrub-robin, Cercotrichas barbata (E)
 Black scrub-robin, Cercotrichas podobe
 Rufous-tailed scrub-robin, Cercotrichas galactotes
 Kalahari scrub-robin, Cercotrichas paena (E)
 Brown-backed scrub-robin, Cercotrichas hartlaubi (E)
 Red-backed scrub-robin, Cercotrichas leucophrys (E)
 Madagascar magpie-robin, Copsychus albospecularis (E-Madagascar)
 Seychelles magpie-robin, Copsychus sechellarum (E-Seychelles)
 White-bellied robin-chat, Cossyphicula roberti (E)
 Mountain robin-chat, Cossypha isabellae (E)
 Archer's robin-chat, Cossypha archeri (E)
 Olive-flanked robin-chat, Cossypha anomala (E)
 Cape robin-chat, Cossypha caffra (E)
 White-throated robin-chat, Cossypha humeralis (E)
 Blue-shouldered robin-chat, Cossypha cyanocampter (E)
 Gray-winged robin-chat, Cossypha polioptera (E)
 Rüppell's robin-chat, Cossypha semirufa (E)
 White-browed robin-chat, Cossypha heuglini (E)
 Red-capped robin-chat, Cossypha natalensis (E)
 Chorister robin-chat, Cossypha dichroa (E)
 White-headed robin-chat, Cossypha heinrichi (E)
 Snowy-crowned robin-chat, Cossypha niveicapilla (E)
 White-crowned robin-chat, Cossypha albicapilla (E)
 Angola cave-chat, Xenocopsychus ansorgei (E-Angola)
 Collared palm-thrush, Cichladusa arquata (E)
 Rufous-tailed palm-thrush, Cichladusa ruficauda (E)
 Spotted morning-thrush, Cichladusa guttata (E)
 European robin, Erithacus rubecula
 White-starred robin, Pogonocichla stellata (E)
 Swynnerton's robin, Swynnertonia swynnertoni (E)
 Brown-chested alethe, Chamaetylas poliocephala (E)
 Red-throated alethe, Chamaetylas poliophrys (E)
 Cholo alethe, Chamaetylas choloensis (E)
 White-chested alethe, Chamaetylas fuelleborni (E)
 Olive-backed forest robin, Stiphrornis pyrrholaemus (E)
 Orange-breasted forest robin, Stiphrornis erythrothorax (E)
 Yellow-breasted forest robin, Stiphrornis mabirae (E)
 Bocage's akalat, Sheppardia bocagei (E)
 Short-tailed akalat, Sheppardia poensis (E)
 Lowland akalat, Sheppardia cyornithopsis (E)
 Equatorial akalat, Sheppardia aequatorialis (E)
 Sharpe's akalat, Sheppardia sharpei (E)
 East coast akalat, Sheppardia gunningi (E)
 Gabela akalat, Sheppardia gabela (E-Angola)
 Usambara akalat, Sheppardia montana (E-Tanzania)
 Iringa akalat, Sheppardia lowei (E-Tanzania)
 Rubeho akalat, Sheppardia aurantiithorax (E-Tanzania)
 White-throated robin, Irania gutturalis
 Thrush nightingale, Luscinia luscinia
 Common nightingale, Luscinia megarhynchos
 Bluethroat, Luscinia svecica
 Siberian rubythroat, Calliope calliope (V)
 Red-breasted flycatcher, Ficedula parva
 Semicollared flycatcher, Ficedula semitorquata
 European pied flycatcher, Ficedula hypoleuca
 Atlas flycatcher, Ficedula speculigera (E)
 Collared flycatcher, Ficedula albicollis
 Moussier's redstart, Phoenicurus moussieri
 Common redstart, Phoenicurus phoenicurus
 White-winged redstart, Phoenicurus erythrogastrus
 Black redstart, Phoenicurus ochruros
 Little rock-thrush, Monticola rufocinereus
 Short-toed rock-thrush, Monticola brevipes (E)
 Sentinel rock-thrush, Monticola explorator (E)
 Forest rock-thrush, Monticola sharpei (E-Madagascar)
 Amber Mountain rock-thrush, Monticola erythronotus (E-Madagascar)
 Littoral rock-thrush, Monticola imerina (E-Madagascar)
 Rufous-tailed rock-thrush, Monticola saxatilis
 Blue rock-thrush, Monticola solitarius
 Miombo rock-thrush, Monticola angolensis (E)
 Cape rock-thrush, Monticola rupestris (E)
 Whinchat, Saxicola rubetra
 Fuerteventura stonechat, Saxicola dacotiae (E)
 European stonechat, Saxicola rubicola
 Siberian stonechat, Saxicola maurus
 African stonechat, Saxicola torquatus
 Pied bushchat, Saxicola caprata (V)
 Buff-streaked chat, Campicoloides bifasciatus (E)
 Sickle-winged chat, Emarginata sinuata (E)
 Karoo chat, Emarginata schlegelii (E)
 Tractrac chat, Emarginata tractrac (E)
 Moorland chat, Pinarochroa sordida (E)
 Mocking cliff-chat, Thamnolaea cinnamomeiventris (E)
 White-winged cliff-chat, Thamnolaea semirufa (E)
 Sooty chat, Myrmecocichla nigra (E)
 Northern anteater-chat, Myrmecocichla aethiops (E)
 Southern anteater-chat, Myrmecocichla formicivora (E)
 Congo moor chat, Myrmecocichla tholloni (E)
 Mountain wheatear, Myrmecocichla monticola (E)
 Rüppell's chat, Myrmecocichla melaena (E)
 Arnot's chat, Myrmecocichla arnotti (E)
 Northern wheatear, Oenanthe oenanthe
 Atlas wheatear, Oenanthe seebohmi (E)
 Capped wheatear, Oenanthe pileata (E)
 Rusty-breasted wheatear, Oenanthe frenata
 Isabelline wheatear, Oenanthe isabellina
 Heuglin's wheatear, Oenanthe heuglini (E)
 Hooded wheatear, Oenanthe monacha
 Desert wheatear, Oenanthe deserti
 Western black-eared wheatear, Oenanthe hispanica
 Cyprus wheatear, Oenanthe cypriaca
 Eastern black-eared wheatear, Oenanthe melanoleuca
 Pied wheatear, Oenanthe pleschanka
 White-fronted black-chat, Oenanthe albifrons (E)
 Somali wheatear, Oenanthe phillipsi (E)
 Red-rumped wheatear, Oenanthe moesta
 Blackstart, Oenanthe melanura
 Familiar chat, Oenanthe familiaris (E)
 Sombre rock chat, Oenanthe dubia (E)
 Brown-tailed chat, Oenanthe scotocerca (E)
 Black wheatear, Oenanthe leucura
 White-crowned wheatear, Oenanthe leucopyga
 Abyssinian wheatear, Oenanthe lugubris (E)
 Finsch's wheatear, Oenanthe finschii
 Mourning wheatear, Oenanthe lugens
 Kurdish wheatear, Oenanthe xanthoprymna
 Persian wheatear, Oenanthe chrysopygia
 Boulder chat, Oenanthe plumosus (E)

WaxwingsOrder: PasseriformesFamily: Bombycillidae

The waxwings are a group of passerine birds with soft silky plumage and unique red tips to some of the wing feathers. In the Bohemian and cedar waxwings, these tips look like sealing wax and give the group its name. These are arboreal birds of northern forests. They live on insects in summer and berries in winter.

 Bohemian waxwing, Bombycilla garrulus (V)

HypocoliusOrder: PasseriformesFamily: Hypocoliidae

The hypocolius is a small Middle Eastern bird with the shape and soft plumage of a waxwing. They are mainly a uniform grey colour except the males have a black triangular mask around their eyes.

 Hypocolius, Hypocolius ampelinus (V)

SugarbirdsOrder: PasseriformesFamily: Promeropidae

The two species in this family are restricted to southern Africa. They have brownish plumage, a long downcurved bill, and long tail feathers.

 Gurney's sugarbird, Promerops gurneyi
 Cape sugarbird, Promerops cafer (E-South Africa)

Dapple-throat and alliesOrder: PasseriformesFamily: Modulatricidae

These species, all of different genera, were formerly placed in family Promeropidae, the sugarbirds, but were accorded their own family in 2017. The entire family is endemic to Africa.

 Spot-throat, Modulatrix stictigula
 Dapple-throat, Arcanator orostruthus
 Gray-chested babbler, Kakamega poliothorax

Sunbirds and spiderhuntersOrder: PasseriformesFamily: Nectariniidae

The sunbirds and spiderhunters are very small passerine birds which feed largely on nectar, although they will also take insects, especially when feeding young. Flight is fast and direct on their short wings. Most species can take nectar by hovering like a hummingbird, but usually perch to feed.

 Fraser's sunbird, Deleornis fraseri (E)
 Gray-headed sunbird, Deleornis axillaris (E)
 Plain-backed sunbird, Anthreptes reichenowi (E)
 Anchieta's sunbird, Anthreptes anchietae (E)
 Mouse-brown sunbird, Anthreptes gabonicus (E)
 Western violet-backed sunbird, Anthreptes longuemarei (E)
 Eastern violet-backed sunbird, Anthreptes orientalis (E)
 Uluguru violet-backed sunbird, Anthreptes neglectus (E)
 Violet-tailed sunbird, Anthreptes aurantius (E)
 Little green sunbird, Anthreptes seimundi (E)
 Green sunbird, Anthreptes rectirostris (E)
 Banded sunbird, Anthreptes rubritorques (E-Tanzania)
 Collared sunbird, Hedydipna collaris (E)
 Pygmy sunbird, Hedydipna platura (E)
 Nile Valley sunbird, Hedydipna metallica
 Amani sunbird, Hedydipna pallidigaster (E)
 Reichenbach's sunbird, Anabathmis reichenbachii (E)
 Principe sunbird, Anabathmis hartlaubii (E-São Tomé and Príncipe)
 Newton's sunbird, Anabathmis newtonii (E-São Tomé and Príncipe)
 Sao Tome sunbird, Dreptes thomensis (E-São Tomé and Príncipe)
 Orange-breasted sunbird, Anthobaphes violacea (E-South Africa)
 Green-headed sunbird, Cyanomitra verticalis (E)
 Bannerman's sunbird, Cyanomitra bannermani (E)
 Blue-throated brown sunbird, Cyanomitra cyanolaema (E)
 Cameroon sunbird, Cyanomitra oritis (E)
 Blue-headed sunbird, Cyanomitra alinae (E)
 Olive sunbird, Cyanomitra olivacea (E)
 Mouse-colored sunbird, Cyanomitra veroxii (E)
 Buff-throated sunbird, Chalcomitra adelberti (E)
 Carmelite sunbird, Chalcomitra fuliginosa (E)
 Green-throated sunbird, Chalcomitra rubescens (E)
 Amethyst sunbird, Chalcomitra amethystina (E)
 Scarlet-chested sunbird, Chalcomitra senegalensis (E)
 Hunter's sunbird, Chalcomitra hunteri (E)
 Bocage's sunbird, Nectarinia bocagii (E)
 Purple-breasted sunbird, Nectarinia purpureiventris (E)
 Tacazze sunbird, Nectarinia tacazze (E)
 Bronze sunbird, Nectarinia kilimensis (E)
 Malachite sunbird, Nectarinia famosa (E)
 Red-tufted sunbird, Nectarinia johnstoni (E)
 Golden-winged sunbird, Drepanorhynchus reichenowi (E)
 Olive-bellied sunbird, Cinnyris chloropygius (E)
 Tiny sunbird, Cinnyris minullus (E)
 Western miombo sunbird, Cinnyris gertrudis (E)
 Eastern miombo sunbird, Cinnyris manoensis (E)
 Southern double-collared sunbird, Cinnyris chalybeus (E)
 Neergaard's sunbird, Cinnyris neergaardi (E)
 Stuhlmann's sunbird, Cinnyris stuhlmanni (E)
 Prigogine's sunbird, Cinnyris prigoginei (E)
 Montane double-collared sunbird, Cinnyris ludovicensis (E)
 Northern double-collared sunbird, Cinnyris reichenowi (E)
 Greater double-collared sunbird, Cinnyris afer (E)
 Regal sunbird, Cinnyris regius (E)
 Rockefeller's sunbird, Cinnyris rockefelleri (E-Democratic Republic of the Congo)
 Eastern double-collared sunbird, Cinnyris mediocris (E)
 Usambara double-collared sunbird, Cinnyris usambaricus (E)
 Forest double-collared sunbird, Cinnyris fuelleborni (E)
 Moreau's sunbird, Cinnyris moreaui (E-Tanzania)
 Loveridge's sunbird, Cinnyris loveridgei (E-Tanzania)
 Beautiful sunbird, Cinnyris pulchellus (E)
 Mariqua sunbird, Cinnyris mariquensis (E)
 Shelley's sunbird, Cinnyris shelleyi (E)
 Congo sunbird, Cinnyris congensis (E)
 Red-chested sunbird, Cinnyris erythrocercus (E)
 Black-bellied sunbird, Cinnyris nectarinioides (E)
 Purple-banded sunbird, Cinnyris bifasciatus (E)
 Tsavo sunbird, Cinnyris tsavoensis (E)
 Violet-breasted sunbird, Cinnyris chalcomelas (E)
 Pemba sunbird, Cinnyris pembae (E-Tanzania)
 Orange-tufted sunbird, Cinnyris bouvieri (E)
 Palestine sunbird, Cinnyris osea
 Shining sunbird, Cinnyris habessinicus
 Splendid sunbird, Cinnyris coccinigastrus (E)
 Johanna's sunbird, Cinnyris johannae (E)
 Superb sunbird, Cinnyris superbus (E)
 Rufous-winged sunbird, Cinnyris rufipennis (E-Tanzania)
 Oustalet's sunbird, Cinnyris oustaleti (E)
 White-breasted sunbird, Cinnyris talatala (E)
 Variable sunbird, Cinnyris venustus (E)
 Dusky sunbird, Cinnyris fuscus (E)
 Ursula's sunbird, Cinnyris ursulae (E)
 Bates's sunbird, Cinnyris batesi (E)
 Copper sunbird, Cinnyris cupreus (E)
 Souimanga sunbird, Cinnyris cupreus (E)
 Malagasy sunbird, Cinnyris cupreus (E)
 Seychelles sunbird, Cinnyris dussumieri (E-Seychelles)
 Humblot's sunbird, Cinnyris humbloti (E-Comoros)
 Anjouan sunbird, Cinnyris comorensis (E-Comoros)
 Mayotte sunbird, Cinnyris coquerellii (E)

Weavers and alliesOrder: PasseriformesFamily: Ploceidae

The weavers are small passerine birds related to the finches. They are seed-eating birds with rounded conical bills. The males of many species are brightly colored, usually in red or yellow and black, some species show variation in colour only in the breeding season.

 White-billed buffalo-weaver, Bubalornis albirostris (E)
 Red-billed buffalo-weaver, Bubalornis niger (E)
 White-headed buffalo-weaver, Dinemellia dinemelli (E)
 Speckle-fronted weaver, Sporopipes frontalis (E)
 Scaly weaver, Sporopipes squamifrons (E)
 White-browed sparrow-weaver, Plocepasser mahali (E)
 Chestnut-crowned sparrow-weaver, Plocepasser superciliosus (E)
 Chestnut-backed sparrow-weaver, Plocepasser rufoscapulatus (E)
 Donaldson Smith's sparrow-weaver, Plocepasser donaldsoni (E)
 Rufous-tailed weaver, Histurgops ruficauda (E-Tanzania)
 Gray-headed social-weaver, Pseudonigrita arnaudi (E)
 Black-capped social-weaver, Pseudonigrita cabanisi (E)
 Sociable weaver, Philetairus socius (E)
 Red-crowned malimbe, Malimbus coronatus (E)
 Black-throated malimbe,  (E)Malimbus cassini
 Ballmann's malimbe, Malimbus ballmanni (E)
 Rachel's malimbe, Malimbus racheliae (E)
 Red-vented malimbe, Malimbus scutatus (E)
 Ibadan malimbe, Malimbus ibadanensis (E-Nigeria)
 Red-bellied malimbe, Malimbus erythrogaster (E)
 Blue-billed malimbe, Malimbus nitens (E)
 Crested malimbe, Malimbus malimbicus (E)
 Red-headed malimbe, Malimbus rubricollis (E)
 Red-headed weaver, Anaplectes rubriceps (E)
 Red weaver, Anaplectes jubaensis (E)
 Yellow-legged weaver, Ploceus flavipes (E-Democratic Republic of the Congo)
 Bertram's weaver, Ploceus bertrandi (E)
 Baglafecht weaver, Ploceus baglafecht (E)
 Black-chinned weaver, Ploceus nigrimentus (E)
 Bannerman's weaver, Ploceus bannermani (E)
 Bates's weaver, Ploceus batesi (E-Cameroon)
 Little weaver, Ploceus luteolus (E)
 Slender-billed weaver, Ploceus pelzelni (E)
 Loango weaver, Ploceus subpersonatus (E)
 Black-necked weaver, Ploceus nigricollis (E)
 Olive-naped weaver, Ploceus brachypterus (E)
 Spectacled weaver, Ploceus ocularis (E)
 Black-billed weaver, Ploceus melanogaster (E)
 Strange weaver, Ploceus alienus (E)
 Cape weaver, Ploceus capensis (E)
 Bocage's weaver, Ploceus temporalis (E)
 African golden-weaver, Ploceus subaureus (E)
 Holub's golden-weaver, Ploceus xanthops (E)
 Orange weaver, Ploceus aurantius (E)
 Golden palm weaver, Ploceus bojeri (E)
 Taveta golden-weaver, Ploceus castaneiceps (E)
 Principe golden-weaver, Ploceus princeps (E-São Tomé and Príncipe)
 Southern brown-throated weaver, Ploceus xanthopterus (E)
 Northern brown-throated weaver, Ploceus castanops (E)
 Ruvu weaver, Ploceus holoxanthus (E-Tanzania)
 Kilombero weaver, Ploceus burnieri (E-Tanzania)
 Northern masked-weaver, Ploceus taeniopterus (E)
 Lesser masked-weaver, Ploceus intermedius
 Southern masked-weaver, Ploceus velatus (E)
 Vitelline masked-weaver, Ploceus vitellinus (E)
 Tanganyika masked-weaver, Ploceus reichardi (E)
 Katanga masked-weaver, Ploceus katangae (E)
 Lake Lufira masked-weaver, Ploceus ruweti (E-Democratic Republic of the Congo)
 Heuglin's masked-weaver, Ploceus heuglini (E)
 Rüppell's weaver, Ploceus galbula
 Speke's weaver, Ploceus spekei (E)
 Fox's weaver, Ploceus spekeoides (E-Uganda)
 Vieillot's black weaver, Ploceus nigerrimus (E)
 Chestnut-and-black weaver, Ploceus castaneofuscus (E)
 Village weaver, Ploceus cucullatus
 Giant weaver, Ploceus grandis (E-São Tomé and Príncipe)
 Weyns's weaver, Ploceus weynsi (E)
 Clarke's weaver, Ploceus golandi (E-Kenya)
 Salvadori's weaver, Ploceus dichrocephalus (E)
 Black-headed weaver, Ploceus melanocephalus (E)
 Golden-backed weaver, Ploceus jacksoni (E)
 Chestnut weaver, Ploceus rubiginosus (E)
 Cinnamon weaver, Ploceus badius (E-Sudan)
 Golden-naped weaver, Ploceus aureonucha (E-Democratic Republic of the Congo)
 Yellow-mantled weaver, Ploceus tricolor (E)
 Maxwell's black weaver, Ploceus albinucha (E)
 Forest weaver, Ploceus bicolor (E)
 Brown-capped weaver, Ploceus insignis (E)
 Yellow-capped weaver, Ploceus dorsomaculatus (E)
 Preuss's weaver, Ploceus preussi (E)
 Olive-headed weaver, Ploceus olivaceiceps (E)
 Usambara weaver, Ploceus nicolli (E-Tanzania)
 Bar-winged weaver, Ploceus angolensis (E)
 Sao Tome weaver, Ploceus sanctithomae (E-São Tomé and Príncipe)
 Nelicourvi weaver, 	Ploceus nelicourvi (E-Madagascar)
 Sakalava weaver, Ploceus sakalava (E-Madagascar)
 Streaked weaver, Ploceus manyar (I)
 Compact weaver, Pachyphantes superciliosus (E)
 Cardinal quelea, Quelea cardinalis (E)
 Red-headed quelea, Quelea erythrops (E)
 Red-billed quelea, Quelea quelea (E)
 Bob-tailed weaver, Brachycope anomala (E)
 Red fody, Foudia madagascariensis (E-Madagascar)
 Aldabra fody, Foudia aldabrana (E-Aldabra)
 Red-headed fody, Foudia eminentissima (E-Comoros)
 Forest fody, Foudia omissa (E-Madagascar)
 Reunion fody, Foudia delloni (E-Réunion) extinct
 Mauritius fody, Foudia rubra (E-Mauritius)
 Seychelles fody, Foudia sechellarum (E-Seychelles)
 Rodrigues fody, Foudia flavicans (E-Rodrigues)
 Northern red bishop, Euplectes franciscanus
 Southern red bishop, Euplectes orix
 Zanzibar red bishop, Euplectes nigroventris (E)
 Black-winged bishop, Euplectes hordeaceus (E)
 Black bishop, Euplectes gierowii (E)
 Yellow-crowned bishop, Euplectes afer
 Fire-fronted bishop, Euplectes diadematus (E)
 Golden-backed bishop, Euplectes aureus (E)
 Yellow bishop, Euplectes capensis (E)
 White-winged widowbird, Euplectes albonotatus
 Yellow-mantled widowbird, Euplectes macroura (E)
 Red-collared widowbird, Euplectes ardens (E)
 Red-cowled widowbird, Euplectes laticauda (E)
 Fan-tailed widowbird, Euplectes axillaris (E)
 Marsh widowbird, Euplectes hartlaubi (E)
 Buff-shouldered widowbird, Euplectes psammocromius (E)
 Long-tailed widowbird, Euplectes progne (E)
 Jackson's widowbird, Euplectes jacksoni (E)
 Grosbeak weaver, Amblyospiza albifrons (E)

Waxbills and alliesOrder: PasseriformesFamily: Estrildidae

The estrildid finches are small passerine birds of the Old World tropics and Australasia. They are gregarious and often colonial seed eaters with short thick but pointed bills. They are all similar in structure and habits, but have wide variation in plumage colors and patterns.

 Gray-headed silverbill, Spermestes griseicapilla (E)
 Bronze mannikin, Spermestes cucullatus
 Magpie mannikin, Spermestes fringilloides (E)
 Black-and-white mannikin, Spermestes bicolor (E)
 African silverbill, Euodice cantans
 Indian silverbill, Euodice malabarica (I)
 Java sparrow, Padda oryzivora (I)
 Scaly-breasted munia, Lonchura punctulata (I) 
 Shelley's oliveback, Nesocharis shelleyi (E)
 White-collared oliveback, Nesocharis ansorgei (E)
 Yellow-bellied waxbill, Coccopygia quartinia (E)
 Angola waxbill, Coccopygia bocagei (E-Angola)
 Swee waxbill, Coccopygia melanotis (E)
 Green-backed twinspot, Mandingoa nitidula (E)
 Shelley's crimsonwing, Cryptospiza shelleyi (E)
 Dusky crimsonwing, Cryptospiza jacksoni (E)
 Abyssinian crimsonwing, Cryptospiza salvadorii (E)
 Red-faced crimsonwing, Cryptospiza reichenovii (E)
 Red-fronted antpecker, Parmoptila rubrifrons (E)
 Woodhouse's antpecker, Parmoptila woodhousei (E)
 Jameson's antpecker, Parmoptila jamesoni (E)
 White-breasted nigrita, Nigrita fusconotus (E)
 Chestnut-breasted nigrita, Nigrita bicolor (E)
 Gray-headed nigrita, Nigrita canicapillus (E)
 Pale-fronted nigrita, Nigrita luteifrons (E)
 Gray-headed oliveback, Delacourella capistrata (E)
 Black-faced waxbill, Brunhilda erythronotos (E)
 Black-cheeked waxbill, Brunhilda charmosyna (E)
 Lavender waxbill, Glaucestrilda coerulescens
 Black-tailed waxbill, Glaucestrilda perreini (E)
 Cinderella waxbill, Glaucestrilda thomensis (E)
 Black-crowned waxbill, Estrilda nonnula (E)
 Black-headed waxbill, Estrilda atricapilla (E)
 Kandt's waxbill, Estrilda kandti (E)
 Orange-cheeked waxbill, Estrilda melpoda
 Anambra waxbill, Estrilda poliopareia (E-Nigeria)
 Fawn-breasted waxbill, Estrilda paludicola (E)
 Common waxbill, Estrilda astrild
 Black-lored waxbill, Estrilda nigriloris (E-Democratic Republic of the Congo)
 Black-rumped waxbill, Estrilda troglodytes
 Crimson-rumped waxbill, Estrilda rhodopyga (E)
 Quailfinch, Ortygospiza atricollis (E)
 Locustfinch, Paludipasser locustella (E)
 Cut-throat, Amadina fasciata (E)
 Red-headed finch, Amadina erythrocephala (E)
 Zebra waxbill, Amandava subflava
 Red avadavat, Amandava amandava (I)
 Purple grenadier, Granatina ianthinogaster (E)
 Violet-eared waxbill, Granatina granatinus (E)
 Southern cordonbleu, Uraeginthus angolensis (E)
 Red-cheeked cordonbleu, Uraeginthus bengalus
 Blue-capped cordonbleu, Uraeginthus cyanocephalus (E)
 Grant's bluebill, Spermophaga poliogenys (E)
 Western bluebill, Spermophaga haematina (E)
 Red-headed bluebill, Spermophaga ruficapilla (E)
 Lesser seedcracker, Pyrenestes minor (E)
 Crimson seedcracker, Pyrenestes sanguineus (E)
 Black-bellied seedcracker, Pyrenestes ostrinus (E)
 Green-winged pytilia, Pytilia melba (E)
 Orange-winged pytilia, Pytilia afra (E)
 Red-winged pytilia, Pytilia phoenicoptera (E)
 Red-billed pytilia, Pytilia lineata (E)
 Red-faced pytilia, Pytilia hypogrammica (E)
 Dybowski's twinspot, Euschistospiza dybowskii (E)
 Dusky twinspot, Euschistospiza cinereovinacea (E)
 Peters's twinspot, Hypargos niveoguttatus (E)
 Pink-throated twinspot, Hypargos margaritatus (E)
 Brown twinspot, Clytospiza monteiri (E)
 Red-billed firefinch, Lagonosticta senegala (E)
 African firefinch, Lagonosticta rubricata (E)
 Jameson's firefinch, Lagonosticta rhodopareia (E)
 Mali firefinch, Lagonosticta virata (E)
 Rock firefinch, Lagonosticta sanguinodorsalis (E)
 Reichenow's firefinch, Lagonosticta umbrinodorsalis (E)
 Black-bellied firefinch, Lagonosticta rara (E)
 Bar-breasted firefinch, Lagonosticta rufopicta (E)
 Brown firefinch, Lagonosticta nitidula (E)
 Black-faced firefinch, Lagonosticta larvata (E)

IndigobirdsOrder: PasseriformesFamily: Viduidae

The indigobirds are finch-like species which usually have black or indigo predominating in their plumage. All are brood parasites, which lay their eggs in the nests of estrildid finches.

 Pin-tailed whydah, Vidua macroura
 Sahel paradise-whydah, Vidua orientalis (E)
 Exclamatory paradise-whydah, Vidua interjecta (E)
 Togo paradise-whydah, Vidua togoensis (E)
 Broad-tailed paradise-whydah, Vidua obtusa (E)
 Eastern paradise-whydah, Vidua paradisaea
 Steel-blue whydah, Vidua hypocherina (E)
 Straw-tailed whydah, Vidua fischeri (E)
 Shaft-tailed whydah, Vidua regia (E)
 Village indigobird, Vidua chalybeata (E)
 Wilson's indigobird, Vidua wilsoni (E)
 Quailfinch indigobird, Vidua nigeriae (E)
 Jos Plateau indigobird, Vidua maryae (E)
 Jambandu indigobird, Vidua raricola (E)
 Baka indigobird, Vidua larvaticola (E)
 Cameroon indigobird, Vidua camerunensis (E)
 Variable indigobird, Vidua funerea (E)
 Purple indigobird, Vidua purpurascens (E)
 Green indigobird, Vidua codringtoni (E)
 Parasitic weaver, Anomalospiza imberbis (E)

AccentorsOrder: PasseriformesFamily: Prunellidae

The accentors are in the only bird family, Prunellidae, which is completely endemic to the Palearctic. They are small, fairly drab species superficially similar to sparrows.

 Alpine accentor, Prunella collaris
 Dunnock, Prunella modularis (V)

Old World sparrowsOrder: PasseriformesFamily: Passeridae

Old World sparrows are small passerine birds. In general, sparrows tend to be small, plump, brown or grey birds with short tails and short powerful beaks. Sparrows are seed eaters, but they also consume small insects.

 House sparrow, Passer domesticus
 Spanish sparrow, Passer hispaniolensis
 Somali sparrow, Passer castanopterus (E)
 Dead Sea sparrow, Passer moabiticus (V)
 Cape Verde sparrow, Passer iagoensis
 Abd al-Kuri sparrow, Passer hemileucus (E)
 Great rufous sparrow, Passer motitensis (E)
 Kenya rufous sparrow, Passer rufocinctus (E)
 Shelley's rufous sparrow, Passer shelleyi (E)
 Kordofan rufous sparrow, Passer cordofanicus (E)
 Cape sparrow, Passer melanurus (E)
 Northern gray-headed sparrow, Passer griseus (E
 Swainson's sparrow, Passer swainsonii (E)
 Parrot-billed sparrow, Passer gongonensis (E)
 Swahili sparrow, Passer suahelicus (E)
 Southern gray-headed sparrow, Passer diffusus (E)
 Desert sparrow, Passer simplex
 Eurasian tree sparrow, Passer montanus
 Sudan golden sparrow, Passer luteus
 Arabian golden sparrow, Passer euchlorus
 Chestnut sparrow, Passer eminibey (E)
 Yellow-spotted bush sparrow, Gymnoris pyrgita (E)
 Yellow-throated sparrow, Gymnoris xanthocollis (V)
 Yellow-throated bush sparrow, Gymnoris superciliaris (E)
 Sahel bush sparrow, Gymnoris dentata
 Rock sparrow, Petronia petronia
 Pale rockfinch, Carpospiza brachydactyla
 White-winged snowfinch, Montifringilla nivalis

Wagtails and pipitsOrder: PasseriformesFamily: Motacillidae

Motacillidae is a family of small passerine birds with medium to long tails. They include the wagtails, longclaws and pipits. They are slender, ground feeding insectivores of open country.

 Cape wagtail, Motacilla capensis (E)
 Mountain wagtail, Motacilla clara (E)
 Sao Tome short-tail, Motacilla bocagii (E-São Tomé and Príncipe)
 Madagascar wagtail, Motacilla flaviventris (E-Madagascar)
 Gray wagtail, Motacilla cinerea
 Western yellow wagtail, Motacilla flava
 Eastern yellow wagtail, Motacilla tschutschensis
 Citrine wagtail, Motacilla citreola 
 African pied wagtail, Motacilla aguimp (E)
 White wagtail, Motacilla alba
 Richard's pipit, Anthus richardi
 African pipit, Anthus cinnamomeus
 Mountain pipit, Anthus hoeschi (E)
 Woodland pipit, Anthus nyassae (E)
 Long-billed pipit, Anthus similis
 Nicholson's pipit, Anthus nicholsoni (E)
 Tawny pipit, Anthus campestris
 Plain-backed pipit, Anthus leucophrys (E)
 Buffy pipit, Anthus vaalensis (E)
 Long-legged pipit, Anthus pallidiventris (E)
 Berthelot's pipit, Anthus berthelotii
 Malindi pipit, Anthus melindae (E)
 Striped pipit, Anthus lineiventris (E)
 Yellow-tufted pipit, Anthus crenatus (E)
 Meadow pipit, Anthus pratensis
 Tree pipit, Anthus trivialis
 Olive-backed pipit, Anthus hodgsoni (V)
 Red-throated pipit, Anthus cervinus
 Water pipit, Anthus spinoletta
 Rock pipit, Anthus petrosus
 American pipit, Anthus rubescens (V)
 Short-tailed pipit, Anthus brachyurus (E)
 Bush pipit, Anthus caffer (E)
 Sokoke pipit, Anthus sokokensis (E)
 Golden pipit, Tmetothylacus tenellus
 Yellow-breasted pipit, Hemimacronyx chloris (E)
 Sharpe's longclaw, Hemimacronyx sharpei (E-Kenya)
 Orange-throated longclaw, Macronyx capensis (E)
 Yellow-throated longclaw, Macronyx croceus (E)
 Fülleborn's longclaw, Macronyx fuelleborni (E)
 Abyssinian longclaw, Macronyx flavicollis (E-Ethiopia)
 Pangani longclaw, Macronyx aurantiigula (E)
 Rosy-throated longclaw, Macronyx ameliae (E)
 Grimwood's longclaw, Macronyx grimwoodi (E)

Finches, euphonias, and alliesOrder: PasseriformesFamily: Fringillidae

Finches are seed-eating passerine birds, that are small to moderately large and have a strong beak, usually conical and in some species very large. All have twelve tail feathers and nine primaries. These birds have a bouncing flight with alternating bouts of flapping and gliding on closed wings, and most sing well.

 Common chaffinch, Fringilla coelebs (V)
 Tenerife blue chaffinch, Fringilla teydea (E)
 Gran Canaria blue chaffinch, Fringilla polatzeki (E)
 Brambling, Fringilla montifringilla
 Hawfinch, Coccothraustes coccothraustes
 Common rosefinch, Carpodacus erythrinus (V)
 Sinai rosefinch, Carpodacus synoicus
 Eurasian bullfinch, Pyrrhula pyrrhula
 Crimson-winged finch, Rhodopechys sanguineus
 Trumpeter finch, Bucanetes githagineus
 Mongolian finch, Bucanetes mongolicus
 Desert finch, Rhodospiza obsoletus (V)
 Somali grosbeak, Rhynchostruthus louisae (E-Somalia)
 European greenfinch, Chloris chloris
 Oriole finch, Linurgus olivaceus (E)
 White-rumped seedeater, Crithagra leucopygia (E)
 Yellow-fronted canary, Crithagra mozambica
 African citril, Crithagra citrinelloides (E)
 Western citril, Crithagra frontalis (E)
 Southern citril, Crithagra hyposticta (E)
 Black-faced canary, Crithagra capistrata (E)
 Papyrus canary, Crithagra koliensis (E)
 Forest canary, Crithagra scotops (E)
 Black-throated canary, Crithagra atrogularis (E)
 Reichenow's seedeater, Crithagra reichenowi (E)
 Yellow-rumped serin, Crithagra xanthopygia (E)
 Lemon-breasted seedeater, Crithagra citrinipectus (E)
 White-bellied canary, Crithagra dorsostriata (E)
 Yellow-throated serin, Crithagra flavigula (E-Ethiopia)
 Salvadori's serin, Crithagra xantholaema (E-Ethiopia)
 Northern grosbeak-canary, Crithagra donaldsoni (E)
 Southern grosbeak-canary, Crithagra buchanani (E)
 Brimstone canary, Crithagra sulphurata (E)
 Yellow canary, Crithagra flaviventris (E)
 White-throated canary, Crithagra albogularis (E)
 Streaky seedeater, Crithagra striolata (E)
 Yellow-browed seedeater, Crithagra whytii (E)
 Thick-billed seedeater, Crithagra burtoni (E)
 Tanzania seedeater, Crithagra melanochroa (E-Tanzania)
 Principe seedeater, Crithagra rufobrunnea (E-São Tomé and Príncipe)
 Sao Tome grosbeak, Crithagra concolor (E-São Tomé and Príncipe)
 Protea canary, Crithagra leucoptera (E-South Africa)
 Black-eared seedeater, Crithagra mennelli (E)
 West African seedeater, Crithagra canicapilla (E)
 Streaky-headed seedeater, Crithagra gularis (E)
 Reichard's seedeater, Crithagra reichardi (E)
 Brown-rumped seedeater, Crithagra tristriata (E)
 Ankober serin, Crithagra ankoberensis (E-Ethiopia)
 Cape siskin, Crithagra totta (E-South Africa)
 Drakensberg siskin, Crithagra symonsi (E)
 Eurasian linnet, Linaria cannabina
 Warsangli linnet, Linaria johannis (E-Somalia)
 Common redpoll, Acanthis flammea 
 Lesser redpoll, Acanthis cabaret 
 Red crossbill, Loxia curvirostra
 European goldfinch, Carduelis carduelis
 Citril finch, Carduelis citrinella (V)
 European serin, Serinus serinus
 Island canary, Serinus canaria (I)
 Fire-fronted serin, Serinus pusillus (V)
 Syrian serin, Serinus syriacus
 Yellow-fronted canary, Serinus flavivertex
 Cape canary, Serinus canicollis
 Ethiopian siskin, Serinus nigriceps (E-Ethiopia)
 Black-headed canary, Serinus alario (E)
 Eurasian siskin, Spinus spinus

Longspurs and snow buntingsOrder: PasseriformesFamily: Calcariidae

The Calcariidae are a family of birds that had been traditionally grouped with the New World sparrows, but differ in a number of respects and are usually found in open grassy areas.

 Lapland longspur, Calcarius lapponicus (V)
 Snow bunting, Plectrophenax nivalis (V)

Old World buntingsOrder: PasseriformesFamily: Emberizidae

The emberizids are a large family of passerine birds. They are seed-eating birds with distinctively shaped bills. Many emberizid species have distinctive head patterns.

 Brown-rumped bunting, Emberiza affinis (E)
 Black-headed bunting, Emberiza melanocephala 
 Red-headed bunting, Emberiza bruniceps (V)
 Corn bunting, Emberiza calandra
 Rock bunting, Emberiza cia
 Cirl bunting, Emberiza cirlus
 Yellowhammer, Emberiza citrinella 
 Pine bunting, Emberiza leucocephalos (V)
 Gray-necked bunting, Emberiza buchanani (V)
 Cinereous bunting, Emberiza cineracea
 Ortolan bunting, Emberiza hortulana
 Cretzschmar's bunting, Emberiza caesia
 Cabanis's bunting, Emberiza cabanisi (E)
 Golden-breasted bunting, Emberiza flaviventris (E)
 Somali bunting, Emberiza poliopleura (E)
 Cape bunting, Emberiza capensis (E)
 Vincent's bunting, Emberiza vincenti (E)
 Lark-like bunting, Emberiza impetuani (E)
 Cinnamon-breasted bunting, Emberiza tahapisi
 Gosling's bunting, Emberiza goslingi (E)
 House bunting, Emberiza sahari
 Striolated bunting, Emberiza striolata
 Reed bunting, Emberiza schoeniclus
 Yellow-breasted bunting, Emberiza aureola (V)
 Little bunting, Emberiza pusilla (V)
 Rustic bunting, Emberiza rustica (V)

New World warblersOrder: PasseriformesFamily: Parulidae

Parulidae are a group of small, often colorful birds restricted to the New World. Most are arboreal and insectivorous.

 Louisiana waterthrush, Parkesia motacilla (V)

TanagersOrder: PasseriformesFamily': Thraupidae

This large family includes the true tanagers, as well as a number of other species often referred to simply as "finches", although they are not members of the true finch family.

Gough Island finch, Rowettia goughensis (E-Gough Island)
Inaccessible Island finch, Nesospiza acunhae (E-Inacessible Island) 
Nightingale Island finch, Neospiza acunhae (E-Nightingale Islands)
Wilkins's finch, Nesospiza wilkinsi'' (E)

See also
List of birds
Lists of birds by region

Notes

References

Birds
Africa